= Financial system in Australia =

Banking and borrowing in Australia

The Australian financial system consists of the arrangements covering the borrowing and lending of funds and the transfer of ownership of financial claims in Australia, comprising:

- authorised deposit-taking institutions (ADIs) or financial institutions, comprising banks, credit unions and building societies,
- non bank financial institutions (NBFI),
- insurance (life and general),
- superannuation,
- financial markets—debt, equity and derivative markets, and
- payments systems—cash, cheques, EFTPOS, RTGS and other high-value payment systems.

== Financial markets ==
The main stock exchange operators in the Australian financial market are the Australian Securities Exchange (ASX) and the smaller National Stock Exchange of Australia (NSX), both of which provide stock exchange facilities for Australian listed securities. NSX acquired the Bendigo Stock Exchange in June 2012 and merged its operations.

Most foreign exchange transactions are largely free from regulation, and the Reserve Bank of Australia has largely delegated its control to authorised money market dealers and foreign exchange dealers.

== Market participants ==
Total employment in the finance industry (thousands of people) since 1984

Participants in the financial system consist of commercial banks, investment banks, finance companies, building or cooperative societies, credit unions, friendly societies, non bank financial institutions (NBFI), superannuation and approved deposit funds, public unit trusts, cash management trusts, mortgage originators, insurance companies, institutional funds investing in and financing debt.

=== Financial institutions ===
Banking in Australia is a central component of the country's financial system and one of the most concentrated banking sectors in the world. As of 2025 the sector contributes 7.5% of GDP and employs 450,000 people.

The industry is dominated by the “Big Four” banks; Commonwealth Bank, Westpac, Australia & New Zealand Bank, and National Australia Bank, which together hold the majority of deposits and lending. The sector is regulated by the Reserve Bank of Australia (RBA), which manages monetary policy and financial stability, and the Australian Prudential Regulation Authority (APRA), which oversees prudential standards. Australian banks are noted for their profitability, systemic importance, and resilience, particularly during the global financial crisis of 2007–2008.

Banking in Australia has its origins in the early nineteenth century, when colonial banks were established to support trade, settlement, and pastoral expansion. The sector experienced rapid growth but also instability, culminating in the banking crisis of 1893, which led to widespread bank failures and restructuring. Through the twentieth century, the system was shaped by government intervention, wartime controls, and the establishment of the Commonwealth Bank as both a commercial and central bank. Post-war reforms and the creation of the RBA in 1959 marked the beginning of a modern regulatory framework.

From the 1980s, financial deregulation transformed the industry. The removal of interest rate controls, floating of the Australian dollar, and entry of foreign banks increased competition and innovation. At the same time, prudential regulation was strengthened to safeguard stability, with APRA created in 1998 to supervise banks, insurers, and superannuation funds. The sector has since embraced digital banking, electronic payments, and online services, making Australia one of the more technologically advanced banking markets.

Despite its strength, the industry has faced scrutiny over misconduct, consumer protection, and market concentration. The Royal Commission into Misconduct in the Banking, Superannuation and Financial Services Industry (2017–2019) exposed widespread failings and led to significant reforms. Australian banks continue to play a pivotal role in the Asia–Pacific region, balancing domestic stability with international expansion. The sector remains a subject of debate over competition, regulation, and its role in supporting sustainable economic growth.

=== Insurance market ===
Australia's insurance market can be divided into roughly three components: life insurance, general insurance and health insurance. These markets have been fairly distinct, with most larger insurers focusing on only one type. However, in recent times several insurance companies have broadened their scope into more general financial services, and have faced competition from banks and subsidiaries of foreign financial conglomerates.

=== Superannuation ===
Superannuation in Australia is government-supported and encouraged, and minimum provisions are compulsory for employees. Superannuation arrangements are provided by banks and insurance companies, though most funds are self-managed. Superannuation funds are tightly regulated.

== Payments and clearing systems ==
There are several payment systems in use within Australia, many of which are regulated by Australian Payments Network (AusPayNet) (previously called Australian Payments Clearing Association (APCA)), including:

=== Cash ===
The Australian dollar is Australia’s currency and legal tender in Australia. Clearing and settling of cash payments (also called CS5) are regulated by AusPayNet as the Australian Cash Distribution Exchange System (ACDES).

=== Cheques ===
Cheques are still the most important non-cash payment instruments in Australia, in terms of the value transferred. The number of monthly cheque transactions in 2008 was 33.7 million with a value of $139.3 billion. Cheque use is in decline worldwide, but it is declining faster in Australia than many other countries. Between 2010 and 2014, cheque use in Australia declined by 42.8% with just over seven cheques written per person in 2014. In 2014, 166.6 million cheques were used in Australia, compared to 291.1 million in 2010. In 2015, cheque usage fell by a further 16.3%.

Cheques and other payment instruments (such as travellers cheques and warrants) (also called CS1) are cleared and settled in accordance with the regulations and procedures set by APCS.

Cheques use MICR encoding containing the BSB and account number to identify the bank and account to debit, as well as other information to streamline the processing of cheques. In 2014, the cost of processing cheques was the highest of all modes of payments at $5 per transaction, compared to about $0.20 for direct debits.

A recent innovation has been digital cheque imaging, which involves images of cheques being captured by financial institutions and exchanged electronically between the relevant financial institutions rather than the previous costly practice of physically transporting paper cheques around Australia. This has also ended the need for maintaining long-term storage and retrieval systems. The new system speeds up the clearing process, with cheques being able to be cleared at the end of the next weekday after being presented, as opposed to up to the six weekdays under the old system.

=== Direct entry ===
Direct entry (also called CS2) can be used to transfer funds between bank accounts in Australia. Clearing and settling is regulated by AusPayNet as the Bulk Electronic Clearing System (BECS).

Direct entry uses the BSB and account number to identify the bank and accounts to debit and credit. Some common uses of the direct entry system include:

- setting up monthly direct debits to pay recurring bills such as credit card bills
- transferring funds to other bank accounts, also known as third party transfers
- payment of wages and salaries
- government tax refunds and payments.

Participants of BECS exchange direct entry (DE) files at intervals through the day. Net positions are usually cleared daily.

=== EFTPOS ===
EFTPOS (Electronic Fund Transfer Point of Sale) and ATM transactions (also called CS3) occur over the EFT network. Clearing and settling of EFTPOS and ATM transactions are regulated by the AusPayNet as the Consumer Electronic Clearing System (CECS). Between 2005 and 2015, ATM withdrawals dropped by 11.5% but increased 5.1% in value.

=== Credit card ===
Several credit card systems are active in Australia including MasterCard, Visa, Diners Club and American Express. The Bankcard scheme is no longer in use.

=== BPAY ===
BPAY is a bill payment system used in Australia, which is regulated by the four major banks and not by AusPayNet. As of January 2015, the BPAY payments system covered more than 156 participating Australian banks, credit unions and financial institutions. More than 45,000 businesses accept payments using BPAY and each month approximately 30 million bills are paid to the value of $24 billion.

=== High value payments ===
High value payments (also known as CS4) are regulated by AusPayNet under the Regulations for High Value Clearing System Framework. The main high value payment systems in Australia are:

- Society for Worldwide Interbank Financial Telecommunication Payment Delivery System (SWIFT PDS)
- Clearing House Electronic Subregister System (CHESS): CHESS is an automated share transfer and settlement system developed by the Australian Securities Exchange. For a CHESS transaction, an interbank request is sent to RITS via SWIFT FIN, the service which sends financial information from one financial institution to another. When RITS notifies CHESS of settlement of the gross amount across ESAs, CHESS finalises the transaction by transferring share holdings at the participant level.
- Financial Transactions Recording and Clearance System (FINTRACS)
- Reserve Bank Information and Transfer System (RITS) is used by banks and other approved institutions to settle their payment obligations on a real-time gross settlement (RTGS) basis. Final and irrevocable settlement is achieved by the simultaneous crediting and debiting of Exchange Settlement Accounts (ESAs) held at the Reserve Bank.

=== New Payments Platform ===
The New Payments Platform (NPP) is open access infrastructure for fast payments in Australia. The NPP was developed via industry collaboration to enable households, businesses and government agencies to make simply addressed payments, with near real-time funds availability to the recipient, on a 24/7 basis. Each payment message is capable of carrying much richer remittance information than other systems. The NPP infrastructure supports the independent development of ‘overlay’ services to offer innovative payment services to end-users.

== Regulation ==
Regulation of the financial system in Australia is split mainly between the Australian Securities & Investments Commission (ASIC) and Australian Prudential Regulation Authority (APRA).

ASIC has responsibility for market integrity and consumer protection and the regulation of certain financial institutions (including investment banks and finance companies or NBFI). The general regulatory position is that a legal person carrying on a financial services business in Australia must either hold an Australian financial services licence issued to that person by ASIC or fall within a licensing exemption.

APRA is responsible for the licensing and prudential supervision of ADIs (banks, building societies, credit unions, friendly societies and participants in certain credit card schemes and certain purchaser payment facilities), life and general insurance companies and superannuation funds. APRA has issued capital adequacy guidelines for banks which are consistent with the Basel II guidelines. All financial institutions regulated by APRA are required to report on a periodic basis to APRA. Certain financial intermediaries, such as investment banks (which do not otherwise operate as ADIs) are neither licensed nor regulated under the Banking Act and are not subject to the prudential supervision of APRA. They may be required to obtain licences under the Corporations Act 2001 or other Commonwealth or state legislation, depending on the nature of their business activities in Australia.

Most investment banks are registered under the Financial Sector (Collection of Data) Act 2001. This Act requires registered financial corporations to provide statistical information to APRA.

The Reserve Bank of Australia is the country's central bank, with responsibility for most payment systems and setting of monetary policy.

Since 1996 the provision of credit to individuals for personal, household or domestic purposes has been regulated by the Uniform Consumer Credit Code, which has been implemented in all Australian states and territories.

Businesses providing financial products and services are required to identify and monitor customers using a risk-based approach, develop and maintain a compliance program, report suspicious matters and certain cash transactions and file annual compliance reports.

- Australian Competition & Consumer Commission
- Australian Securities Exchange
- Australian Payments Network

== See also ==
- Economy of Australia
