= Bank state branch =

Unique identifier of a bank branch in Australia

A Bank State Branch (often referred to as "BSB") is the name used in Australia for a bank code, which is a branch identifier. The BSB is normally used in association with the account number system used by each financial institution. The structure of the BSB + account number does not permit for account numbers to be transferable between financial institutions. While similar in structure, the New Zealand and Australian systems are only used in domestic transactions and are incompatible with each other. For international transfers, a SWIFT code is used in addition to the BSB and account number.

The BSB identifier consists of six numerals, the first two or three of which is a bank identifier. Many banks only have one BSB for all branches and accounts. The BSB is used for processing of paper and electronic transactions, but not in payment card numbering.

In 1992, the Australian Payments Network (AusPayNet) became the regulatory body of cheque clearances and of the BSB codes in Australia. AusPayNet assigns the bank code to a financial institution and the financial institution allocates the other digits to its branches, in line with guidelines set by AusPayNet. Some financial institutions have more than one bank identifier, arising from mergers of financial institutions or consolidating by banks of their trading and savings banks operations. As of March 2012, almost 14,300 unique BSB code values were in use.

== Usage ==
In Australia, BSB codes are allocated by the Australian Payments Network (AusPayNet). BSB codes are used in a number of payment systems in Australia. To access the various clearance systems a financial institution must have its own BSB or use an intermediary with a BSB.

=== Paper transactions ===
Cheques are the least used form of non-cash payment in Australia, but the most by value. Financial institutions are required to include BSB and bank account numbers on cheques, at the bottom of the cheque in MICR form, which identify the specific bank account number to be debited. BSB codes are also used on pre-printed deposit and other vouchers. Paper transactions are processed under the Australian Paper Clearing System (APCS) (also known as CS1) drawn up by AusPayNet. Account instructions which do not have a BSB code are processed manually.

=== Electronic transactions ===
Electronic fund transfers (EFT) are the most common method of non-cash payment in Australia. EFT transactions between bank accounts use the Direct Entry system or the New Payments Platform (NPP). For transfers using the Direct Entry system, BSB and bank account numbers must be given for the accounts to be debited as well as for the account to which funds are to be transferred. For transfers using the NPP, BSB and account numbers or a payee's PayID must be given for the payee account to be credited. Electronic direct entry transactions are processed under the Bulk Electronic Clearing System (BECS) (also known as CS2) drawn up by AusPayNet. NPP transactions are processed under the NPP Regulations administered by NPP Australia Limited. The requirement for two-sided BSBs is eased in transactions involving payment cards, such as credit cards or debit cards, and in BPAY transactions, in which one side of the transfer is an account which includes the BSB electronically linked to the card and BPAY biller.

=== International transactions ===
For incoming international transfers, SWIFT codes are used in addition to the Basic Bank Account Number (BBAN), which comprises a BSB and bank account number. There is no public discussion of the adoption of IBAN identifiers for incoming international transactions. Any process towards IBAN would involve considerable changes to bank software and computer systems, and the requirement for financial institutions to adopt defined length account numbers. Outgoing international transfers must use either the SWIFT or IBAN system in use in the destination country, which would incorporate that country's format for BBAN.

== Format ==
The BSB is a six-digit code, usually presented as nnn-nnn. Originally, the format of the BSB code was for the first two digits to indicate the "bank" and the other four digits specified the "branch" of that financial institution, the first digit of which was the state code indicating the state where the branch was located. Some banks may use only one BSB for all branches.

For example, the Australian BSB code "033088" breaks down to:

- 03 = Westpac, historically the trading operation
- 3 = Victoria
- 088 = 383 Chapel Street, Prahran

Some of the larger banks had two bank codes, with separate codes for their trading (cheque) and savings bank entities. The first digit of the bank code was either 0 (for trading bank accounts) or 1 (for savings bank accounts), with a common second digit. For example, 03 was for Westpac's trading accounts, while 73 was for Westpac's savings accounts. Some banks continue to use two bank codes, which today are of only historic and legacy significance.

== History ==
Following the introduction in the United Kingdom in the 1960s of a "sort code", a comparable BSB identifier system was introduced in Australia in the early 1970s to streamline cheque clearance through the banking system in Australia. At the time the clearance systems were open only to financial institutions registered as banks. The BSB and account number was printed on cheques in MICR format to streamline the process of data capture as well as for mechanical sorting and bundling of the physical cheques for forwarding to the payer bank branch for final cheque clearance. Other financial institutions had to use banks as intermediaries to access the clearance of their "payment orders", which were the non-banking equivalents of cheques.

Since then, the use of BSBs has been extended to electronic transactions, but not in payment card numbering.

With the restructuring of the financial system in Australia, other financial institutions were given direct access to the clearing systems, and the structure of the BSB has had to be modified. While banks generally still follow the traditional state branch structure, building societies and credit unions often do not. This is because many of these institutions use an intermediary; for example, BSBs such as 80xxxx are administered by Cuscal, 579xxx are administered by Australian Settlements Limited, whereas 704xxx is administered by Indue. In these situations, the building society or credit union is identified by the 'state' and 'branch' components of the BSB whereas the 'bank' refers to the intermediary. Depending on the intermediary used, building societies (both current and former) BSBs generally start with 63xxxx and most credit unions BSBs will use either 704xxx or 80xxxx. The state code structure is not always used in these situations. For example, Bendigo Bank started as a building society in Victoria but now uses a single BSB nationally (633-000) while the Queensland-based Heritage Bank, also a former building society, uses 638xxx. Suncorp Bank uses 484-799 for all deposit accounts regardless of which branch or state the account was opened in.

Furthermore, recent changes in Australia's financial system have allowed larger building societies and credit unions to establish their own BSBs, even if they are using an intermediary. Having their own BSB allows a financial institution to create new products and offer additional services.

== List of Australian bank codes ==
Number	Code	Bank Name
01	ANZ	ANZ
03 or 73	WBC	Westpac
06 or 76	CBA	Commonwealth Bank
08 or 78	NAB	National Australia Bank
09	RBA	Reserve Bank of Australia
10	BSA	BankSA
11 or 33	STG or SGP	St George Bank
12 or 639	BQL or HOM	Bank of Queensland; 639 refers to Home Building Society which has since been acquired by Bank of Queensland
14	PIB	Rabobank
15	T&C	Town & Country Bank; acquired by ANZ
18	MBL	Macquarie Bank
19	BOM	Bank of Melbourne, previously Advance Bank
21	CMB	JPMorgan Chase Bank
22	BNP	BNP Paribas
23	BAL	Bank of America
24	CTI	Citibank Australia
255	BPS	BNP Paribas
259	ALX	Alex Bank
26	BTA	BT Financial Group
28	NMB	National Mutual Royal Bank, joint venture between Royal Bank of Canada & National Mutual Insurance (sold to ANZ)
29	BOT	Bank of Tokyo
30	BWA	Bankwest
31	BAU	Bank Australia
325	BYB	Beyond Bank
34 or 985	HBA or HSB	HSBC Bank Australia
35 or 980	BOC or BCA	Bank of China
40	CST	Commonwealth Bank, formerly Colonial State Bank, which was previously State Bank of New South Wales
41	DBA	Deutsche Bank
42 or 52	TBT	Colonial Trust Bank, formerly Trust Bank of Tasmania, now part of Commonwealth Bank
45	OCB	OCBC Bank
46	ADV	Advance Bank (branches in the ACT)
47	CBL	Challenge Bank, which has since been acquired by Westpac
48 or 664	MET or SUN	Suncorp Bank; 48 was used by Metway Bank prior to its merger with Suncorp Building Society
510	CAN	Citibank Australia
512	CFC	Community First Credit Union
514	QTM	RACQ Bank, previously QT Mutual Bank
517	VOL	Volt Bank commenced operations in Australia 2018
527	TBT	Trust Bank of Tasmania, now Commonwealth Bank
533	BCC	Bananacoast Community Credit Union
55	BML	Bank of Melbourne (1989), formerly RESI-Statewide Building Society, now part of the Westpac Group
57	ASL	Australian Settlements, an intermediary used by many organisations including Building Societies
60	SBV	State Bank of Victoria, prior to merger with Commonwealth Bank
610	ADL	Adelaide Bank
611	SEL	Australian Mutual Bank, previously Sydney Credit Union (611100) and Endeavour Mutual Bank (611000)
630	ABS	ABS Building Society
632	BAE	B&E now trading as Bank of us
633	BBL	Bendigo & Adelaide Bank, includes UP Bank (633-123) and Rural Bank (633-111)
634	UFS	Uniting Financial Services
636	HAY	Hay Limited
637	GBS	Greater Bank
638 or 880	HBS	Heritage Bank
639	HOM	Home Building Society (WA) acquired by Bank of Queensland
640	HUM	Hume Bank
641 or 647	IMB or AUB	IMB Bank
642	ADC	Australian Military Bank, previously Australian Defence Credit Union
645 or 656	MPB or BAY	Wide Bay Australia, now Auswide Bank
646	MMB	Maitland Mutual Building Society
650	NEW	Newcastle Permanent Building Society
653	PPB	Pioneer Permanent Building Society; since acquired by Bank of Queensland
654	ECU	ECU Australia
655	ROK	The Rock Building Society, now part of MyState
656	BAY	Auswide Bank, previously Wide Bay Building Society
659	GCB	G&C Mutual Bank, previously SGE Credit Union
670	YOU	UBank commenced as 86400 Bank in 2018 then purchased by NAB and rebranded UBank
671	HPC	Heritage People's Choice following the merger of Heritage Bank & People's Choice Credit Union
676	GTW	Gateway Bank previously CBOA Credit Union
70	CUS	Indue, an intermediary used by many organisations (particularly credit unions)
704-191	CUS	BankFirst previously Victoria Teachers Credit Union & Victoria Teachers Mutual Bank
704-230	CUS	BankVic previously Police Association Credit Co Operative or Police Credit & Police Credit Co-Op
704-865	CUS	Qudos Bank trading name of Qudos Mutual Ltd, previously Qantas Credit Union & Qantas Staff Credit Union
721	HCC	Holiday Coast Credit Union
722	SNX	Southern Cross Credit Union
723	HIC	Heritage Isle Credit Union
728	SCU	Summerland Credit Union (1 July 2011 728-728)
775	XIN	Xinja ceased trading late 2020
772	REV	Revolut Payments Australia
777	PNB	Police & Nurses Ltd
80	CRU	Cuscal, an intermediary used by many organisations (particularly credit unions)
805-050	CRU	People's Choice Credit Union trading name of Australian Central Credit Union
812	TMB	Teachers Mutual Bank
813	CAP	The Capricornian
814	CUA	Great Southern Bank
815	PCU	Police Bank
817	WCU	Warwick Credit Union
818	COM	Bank of Communications
819	IBK	Industrial & Commercial Bank of China
833	DBL	Defence Bank, previously 803-205 Defence Force Credit Union
882	MMP	Unity Bank previously Maritime, Mining & Power Credit Union
888	CCB	China Construction Bank Corporation
889	DBS	DBS_Bank Australia Branch
902	APO	Australia Post
911	SMB	Sumitomo Mitsui Banking Corporation
913	SSB	State Street Bank & Trust Company
915	FNC	FNC Agency - Bank One, NA
917	ARA	Arab Bank Australia
918	MCB	Mizuho Corporate Bank
922	UOB	United Overseas Bank
923 or 936	ING or GNI	ING Bank
931	ICB	Mega International Commercial Bank Co
932	NEC	New England Credit Union (trading as Regional Australia Bank)
939	AMP	AMP Bank
941	BCY	Delphi Bank; formerly Bank of Cyprus Australia, since acquired by Bendigo Bank, brand retired by BBL in 2022 all account now under BSB 633
942	LBA	Bank of Sydney previously known as Bank of Beirut and Beirut Hellenic Bank
943	TBB	Taiwan Business Bank
944	MEB	ME Bank brand sold to BOQ
946	UBS	UBS
951	INV	Investec now trading as BOQ Specialist
952	RBS	Royal Bank of Scotland
969	MSL	Tyro Payments
980	BCA	Bank of China
985	HSB	HSBC Bank Australia

== State codes ==
Historically, the major banks structured their BSB codes by states. This is largely historic and have only limited significance in electronic banking. For those that still maintain state codes, the state code is the first of the four digit branch field, as follows:

- 2 - Australian Capital Territory, New South Wales
- 3 - Victoria
- 4 - Queensland
- 5 - South Australia, Northern Territory
- 6 - Western Australia
- 7 - Tasmania
- 8, 9 - (intermediary)

== See also ==
- Bank card number
- ISO 9362, the standard for SWIFT codes, international bank identifiers
- List of banks in Australia
- New Zealand bank account prefix
- ABA routing transit number
- Routing number (Canada)
- Sort code, a number used in the United Kingdom and Ireland that is similar to the BSB
