= New Zealand bank account number =

New Zealand bank account numbers in NZD follow a standardised format of 16 digits:

- a prefix representing the bank and branch (six digits), otherwise known as the Bank code;
- the body (seven digits); and
- the suffix representing the product/account type (two or three digits).

While the New Zealand format is similar to Australia's Bank State Branch, the two systems are not interchangeable.

New Zealand bank account numbers in foreign currencies vary by bank.

== Background ==
The origins of the format lay in the establishment of the Databank Systems Limited, a company set up by a consortium of competing New Zealand banks, to provide computing resources (development and operational) for the consortium members.

Bank codes are coordinated by Payments NZ who administer the Bulk Electronic Clearing System (BECS). The scope of BECS includes direct debits, automatic payments, bill payments, and direct credits. Payments NZ also administer the following payment systems in New Zealand:

- Paper Clearing System
- High Value Clearing System
- Consumer Electronic Clearing System

== Format of account numbers ==
Account numbers are generally presented in the format:

BB-bbbb-AAAAAAA-SSS

where B is the bank number (2 digits), b is the branch number (4 digits), A is the account number (7 digits) and S are digits of the suffix (2 or 3 digits). Where a bank displays the suffix as two digits, a leading zero is added to pad the suffix to three digits; i.e. BB-bbbb-AAAAAAA-SS becomes BB-bbbb-AAAAAAA-0SS.

This format allows customers to have a single account number with differing suffixes for multiple accounts of differing types. This does not include credit card and loan products.

== Account number prefix ==
Bank accounts are prefixed with six digits, two indicating the bank and four which indicate the branch. The table below shows which banks are allocated which bank prefix. A current list of branches as their associated bank/branch numbers is available for download from the Payments NZ website.

Bank name	Bank prefix	Branch range
ANZ	01, 04, 06 and 11 (see below)	0001–5699
BNZ	02	0001–1299
The Co-operative Bank	02	1242, 1245–1250 (agency arrangement via BNZ)
Westpac	03	0001–1999
Heartland	03	
Kookmin Bank	02	Agency arrangement via BNZ
NZCU	03	Agency arrangement via Westpac
Rabobank New Zealand	03	0001–1999
China Construction Bank New Zealand	05	8884-8889
National Bank of New Zealand (Note: This bank no longer trades under this name or is defunct.) now ANZ	06	0001–1499
National Australia Bank	08	0000–9999
Industrial and Commercial Bank of China	10	5165—5169
PostBank	11	5000–8999
ASB	12	3000–3999
Trust Bank Southland	13	4900–4999
Trust Bank Otago	14	4700–4799
TSB	15	3900–3999
Trust Bank Canterbury	16	4400–4499
Trust Bank Waikato	17	3300–3399
Trust Bank Bay of Plenty	18	3500–3599
Trust Bank South Canterbury	19	4600–4649
Trust Bank Auckland	21	4800–4899
Trust Bank Central	20	4100–4199
Trust Bank Wanganui	22	4000–4049
Westland Bank	24	4300–4349
Trust Bank Wellington	23	3700–3799
Countrywide	25	2500–2599
United Bank	29	0000–9999
HSBC	30	2900–2956
Citibank	31	2800–2849
Kiwibank	38	9000–9499
Bank of China	88	8800-8805

Transferwise as of 2024 uses bank prefix 04.

Revolut operates as Revolut Bank New Zealand Limited and uses bank prefix 04.

== Account number body ==
The account body consists of seven digits, right adjusted and padded with zeroes if necessary. A prefix and account body combination can be validated using a modulus algorithm, but the account body does not include a check digit.

== Account number suffix ==
The table below shows the account number suffixes as introduced by Databank Systems Limited from 1969.

Type of account	Suffix
Cheque Account	00
Number 2 Account	02
Fixed Account	03
Savings Account	30
Credit Card Account	40
Thrift Club Account	50
Term Deposit Account	81

Some banks (such as BNZ) include three digits of the suffix in their presentation of the number to the end customer. Other banks only show the last two digits of the suffix to the end customer. Technically, all banks have three digit suffixes, it's just that the first digit of the suffix is always 0 so it's usually ignored.

== See also ==
- Bank code – Code assigned by a central bank to other institutions
- Bank State Branch – Unique identifier of a bank branch in Australia
- Databank Systems Limited – Financial computing shared service
- ISO 9362 – SWIFT business identifier coding standard
- ABA routing transit number – Code used in U.S. check transactions
- Routing number (Canada) – Bank identification code
- Sort code – Bank transfer codes in the UK and Ireland
