= Bankleitzahl =

Bank code used in Germany and Austria

In Germany and Austria, the Bankleitzahl (BLZ) is a code that uniquely identifies a bank. The bank code always consists of eight digits in Germany and five digits in Austria. In Switzerland and Liechtenstein, the bank clearing number (BC number) has the same meaning. The bank sort code must be specified for many business transactions in payment transactions (e.g. bank transfer).

With the establishment of the Single Euro Payments Area (SEPA), which completely replaced the national payment systems from 1 February 2014, the bank codes in the participating countries were replaced by BIC (Business Identifier Code), also known as SWIFT code. At the same time, in some countries, including Germany, the bank routing numbers became part of the International Bank Account Number (IBAN) together with the account number.

== See also ==
- ABA routing transit number for American equivalent
- Routing number (Canada) for Canadian equivalent
- Sort code for UK and Irish equivalent
