= Routing number =

Routing number may refer to:

- a form of bank code, in particular:
  - Routing number (Canada)
  - ABA routing transit number, a bank code used in the United States
