= Nominal number =

Type of unique identifier

Nominal numbers are numerals used as labels to identify items uniquely. Importantly, the actual values of the numbers which these numerals represent are less relevant, as they do not indicate quantity, rank, or any other measurement.

Labelling a pair of referees as referees "1" and "2" is a use of nominal numbers. Any set of numbers (a subset of the natural numbers) will be consistent labels as long as a distinct number is uniquely used for each distinct term which needs to be labelled. Nonetheless, sequences of integers may naturally be used as the simplest way to begin labelling; for example, 1, 2, 3, and so on.

== Definition ==
The term "nominal number" may be quite recent and of limited use. It appears to have originated in school textbooks derived from the statistical term "nominal data", defined as data indicating "merely statements of qualitative category of membership". This usage comes from the sense of nominal as "name".

Mathematically, nominal numbering could be thought of as a bijection —that is, an injective and surjective function— from a set of entities onto a set of numerals. Proving a mapping is a bijection involves these arguments:

- The mapping being described is well-defined as a function, since each entity has always assigned to it a single numeral; neither a null amount of numerals nor many numerals at once.
- It is injective, since the assumption is of different entities having different numerals, never sharing the same numeral.
- It is surjective, since for every numeral in the numerals set, the assumption is one can find an entity which is described by it.

In reality, the sets of entities and numerals change, and mappings morph with time or even with different speakers, making this a very strict interpretation. It also behooves oneself to think of how to deal with unrealized entities, only existing in language (such as a nonexistent bus route number). Alternative definitions can be considered without injection, without surjection, relaxing the definition of a function to allow for multi-valued functions, or with wholly different mathematical models.

"Nominal number" can be broadly defined as "any numeral used for identification, however it was assigned", or narrowly as "a numeral with no information other than identification".

For the purposes of naming, the term "number" is often used loosely to refer to any string (sequence of symbols), which may not consist entirely of digits—it is often alphanumeric. For instance, UK National Insurance numbers, some driver's licence numbers, and some serial numbers contain letters.

=== Use of nominal numbers ===
"Nominal" refers to the use of numbers: any nominal number can be used by its numerical value as an integer—added to another, multiplied, compared in magnitude, and so forth—but for nominal numbers these operations are not, in general, meaningful. For example, the ZIP code 11111 is less than the ZIP code 12345, but that does not necessarily mean that 11111 was issued before 12345 or that the region denoted by 11111 is further south than 12345, though it might be. Similarly, one can add or subtract ZIP codes, but this is meaningless: 12345 − 11111 does not have any meaning as a ZIP code.

In general, the only meaningful operation with nominal numbers is to compare two nominal numbers to see whether they are identical or not (whether they refer to the same object).

== Examples ==
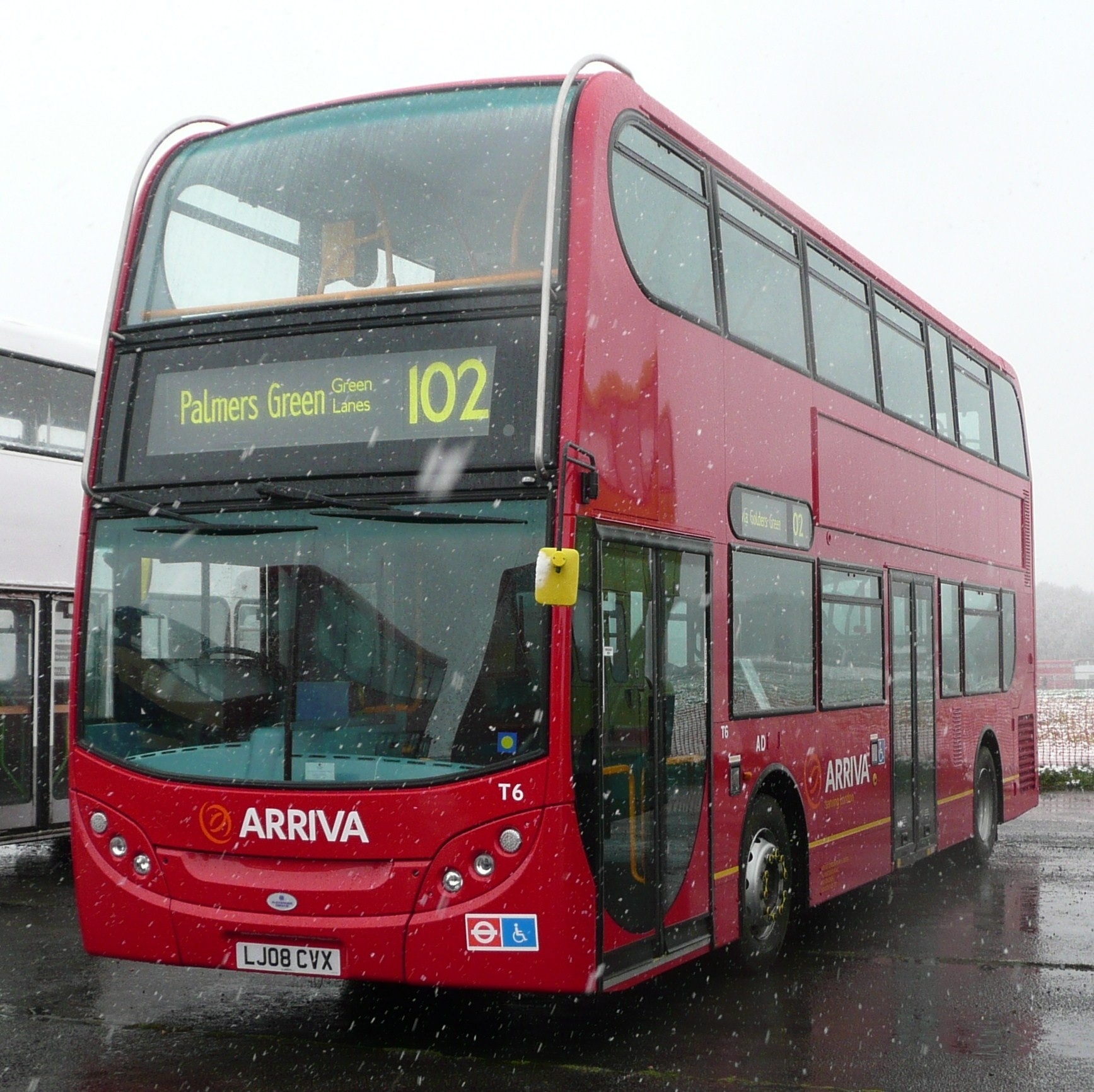
Numbers 102 and 400: bus route 102 in London, run by an Alexander Dennis Enviro400 double-decker bus

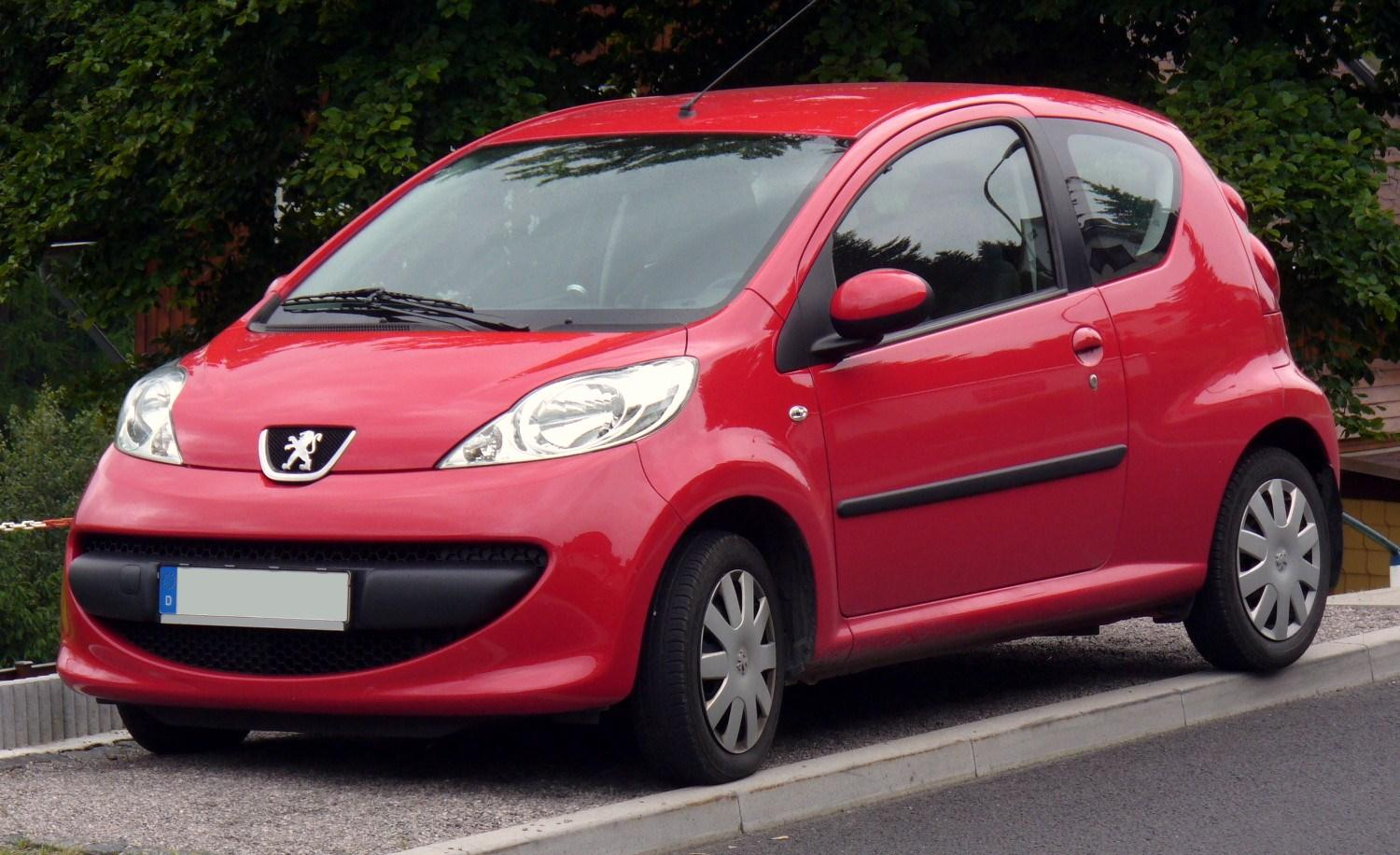
Number 107: the car Peugeot 107

A great variety of numbers meet the broad definition, including:

- National identification numbers, such as:
  - Social Security numbers
  - Driver's license numbers
  - National Insurance number
- Routing numbers, such as:
  - Bank codes and sort codes, such as International Bank Account Numbers or ABA routing transit numbers.
  - Postal codes, such as ZIP codes (these are generally numeric in the United States, but other nations often use alphanumeric systems)
  - Telephone numbers, assigned by various telephone numbering plans, such as the ITU-T E.164 and the North American Numbering Plan (NANPA).
  - Numbers of train or bus routes or the individual vehicles in public transport
- Car model names from some car manufacturers, such as BMW or Peugeot, are plain numbers.

These are usually assigned either in some hierarchical way, such as how telephone numbers are assigned (in NANPA) as Country Code + Area Code + Prefix + Suffix, where the first three are geographically based, or sequentially, as in serial numbers; these latter are thus properly ordinal numbers.

=== Narrowly defined ===
Numerical identifiers that are nominal numbers narrowly defined, viz, convey no information other than identity, are quite rare. These must be defined either arbitrarily or randomly, and most commonly arise in computer applications, such as dynamic IP addresses assigned by Dynamic Host Configuration Protocol. A more everyday example are sports squad numbers, which do not in general have any public meaning beyond identity, though they may be allocated based on some internal club or organization policy. In some settings, these are based on position, but in others they are associated with an individual, being a proper nominal number. The naming function is demonstrated by "retired numbers", where a club no longer issues a number that has become associated with a particularly famous player, but reallocate others to new players when they become available.

== See also ==
- Numbering scheme
- Serial number
- Symbol (programming)
- Unique key
- Universally Unique Identifier
