= Transit number =

Transit number may refer to:

- ABA routing transit number, a bank code used in the United States
- Transit number, the branch identification portion of a Canadian bank routing number
