= Cuscal =

Australian financial services company

Cuscal Limited
- Type: Public
- Traded as: ASX: CCL
- Industry: Payments Provider, Financial services
- Founded: Founded in 1966 (origins)
- Headquarters: Sydney, Australia
- Area served: Australia
- Products: Payments provider and data provider
- Number of employees: 591 (2023)
- Website: www.cuscal.com

Cuscal Limited is an Australian company that provides payments and data to Australian Banks, credit unions, mutual savings banks, corporates and Fintechs.

Cuscal is regulated by the Australian Prudential Regulation Authority (APRA) as an Australian authorised deposit-taking institution (ADI), and by the Australian Securities & Investments Commission (ASIC). It is a member of EFTPOS Payments Australia and the Australian Payments Clearing Association.

== History ==
Cuscal was established in 1992 as the Credit Union Services Corporation Limited and became Credit Union Services Corporation (Australia) Limited before changing its name to Cuscal Limited in December 2005. Cuscal replaced the state based credit union bodies, which had been in operation since 1956. Cuscal was incorporated as a Special Service Provider (SSP) under the financial institutions scheme.

In 1994, Cuscal released the Credit Union Code of Practice. Until the Credit Union Industry Association (CUIA) and the Australia Association of Permanent Building Societies (AAPBS) merged to form a new joint industry association in 2006, the Association of Building Societies and Credit Unions (Abacus – Australian Mutuals) now the Customer Owned Banking Association (COBA), Cuscal also assumed the role of a trade association for Australian credit unions and co-operatives.

In 2014, Cuscal acquired Strategic Payments Services.

In 2023, Cuscal cut services to Binance.
