= IPSO =

IPSO may refer to:

== Organisations ==
- Independent Press Standards Organisation, a press industry regulator in the UK
- International Programme on the State of the Ocean
- Les Intellectuels pour la souveraineté, a group of intellectuals studying and promoting Quebec independence
- IPSO Alliance, promoting the Internet Protocol for what it calls "smart object" communications
- Irish Payment Services Organisation
- International Psychosocial Organisation

== Other uses ==
- Ipso (candy), a small drop-style candy sold in Great Britain in the 1970s–1980s
- Ipso, an arene substitution pattern in organic chemistry
- Ipso facto, a Latinate phrase used in law
- Check Point IPSO, an operating system for Nokia IP Security Platforms
- IPSO, a brand of Alliance Laundry Systems

== See also ==
- Ipsos, a global market research firm
