= National Stock Exchange =

National Stock Exchange may refer to:

- National Stock Exchange of Australia
- National Stock Exchange of India
- National Stock Exchange (Jersey City, New Jersey) (ceased trading operations in 2014)
