= Prudential Regulation Authority (disambiguation) =

Prudential Regulatory Authority or Prudential Regulation Authority may refer to:

- Australian Prudential Regulation Authority
- Prudential Regulation Authority
