= New Payments Platform =

Fast payments platform for Australia

New Payments Platform Australia
- Company type: Public (unlisted)
- Traded as: New Payments Platform Australia Limited (ABN 68 601 428 737)
- Industry: Payments
- Founded: June 2013; 13 years ago
- Headquarters: 255 George Street, Sydney, Australia
- Website: www.nppa.com.au

The New Payments Platform (NPP), owned and operated by New Payments Platform Australia Ltd (NPPA) is a national industry-wide real-time payments platform for Australia. As of April 2025, there are over 25 million registered PayIDs.

In 2021, NPP Australia became a wholly owned subsidiary of Australian Payments Plus (AP+) after the ACCC authorised the amalgamation with BPAY Group and eftpos.

== History ==
The new instant payment platform for real-time low-value payments was in response to the Reserve Bank of Australia's Payment System Board's Conclusions to the Strategic Review of the Innovation in Payments System publication. The NPP was announced in July 2013 by the Australian Payments Clearing Association. In December 2014, the Program proceeded to the third phase: "design, build and test." In 2015 a contract was signed with SWIFT to design, build and operate the platform.

It took approximately 6 years to implement and became accessible to the general public on 13 February 2018 with the introduction of PayID, an addressing capability, and Osko, the first NPP overlay service, operated by BPAY.

In September 2021, the Australian Competition & Consumer Commission (ACCC) authorised a proposed merger of the New Payments Platform of eftpos Payments Australia and BPAY.

== Services ==
=== PayTo ===
The Mandated Payment Service is now known as PayTo. It is a system for enabling "withdrawals" on the NPP whereby businesses to initiate real-time payments from a customers’ bank account. The NPP does not inherently support "withdrawals", so the service provides an overlay allowing the "withdrawing" party to create a payment order and authorisation request. PayTo can also be used by third parties to conduct payments on behalf such as for corporate payroll and accounts payable.

=== PayID ===
PayID is NPP's addressing service to enable payments. Its PayTo facility allows for payments to be sent by a user to a PayID. The following chart compares PayID mobile payments via NPP to electronic payments, or bank transfers.

| Compare | PayID/PayTo | Bank transfer |
|---|---|---|
| Transfer Time | Less than 1 minute, normally | Up to 3 working days |
| Activation | Opt-in, via your bank | Always |
| Payee ID | Phone number, email or ABN | BSB and account number |
| Withdrawals | via PayTo | Possible (if they have your password) |
| Direct Debit | via PayTo, with payee authorisation | Possible, but requires payee to cancel |
| Availability | 24/7 | Banking hours only |
| Full Payee Name | Confirmed before approval | Not included |
| Transfer description | 280 characters (allows emojis) | 18 characters |
| Remitter name | Personal or business account name | 16 characters |
| Change accounts | Keep PayID or create new one | Same BSB and new account number |
| Switch banks | Keep PayID or create new one | New BSB and new account number |
| Multiple IDs | Use multiple emails | Never |
| Pay Overseas | In the near future | Current |

PayID will coexist with the BSB and account number addressing scheme.

=== Osko ===
Osko is owned and operated by BPAY, and operates on the NPP as an overlay service. It uses PayID as a reference for payments. Payments are instant to accounts that have been transferred to previously.

In 2021, BPAY attributed a change in NPPA strategy (particularly the announcement of MPS, the Mandated Payment Service), as the cause of write-down in the value of their Osko business.

== NPP Australia ==
NPP Australia is a non-profit public company established to oversee the operation of the NPP and is owned by 13 shareholders. It is governed by a board of 12 voting Directors, including 3 independent directors, and the RBA.

New Payments Platform Australia Limited Shareholders
NPP Australia
Australia and New Zealand Banking Corporation
Australian Settlements Limited
Bendigo and Adelaide Bank Limited
Citigroup Pty Ltd
Commonwealth Bank of Australia
Cuscal Limited
HSBC Bank Australia Limited
Indue Limited
ING Australia
Macquarie Bank Limited
National Australia Bank Limited
Westpac Banking Corporation
Reserve Bank of Australia

== Participant Banks ==
Financial institutions need to ensure that their NPP services can reliably handle the full range of payments. All NPP Participants must meet availability requirements of no more than two minutes outage per month.

== Controversy ==
=== Online scams ===
PayID has been noted in Australia as a vehicle for online scammers on social media marketplaces.
