= Volt Bank =

Australian consumer neobank

Volt Bank Limited
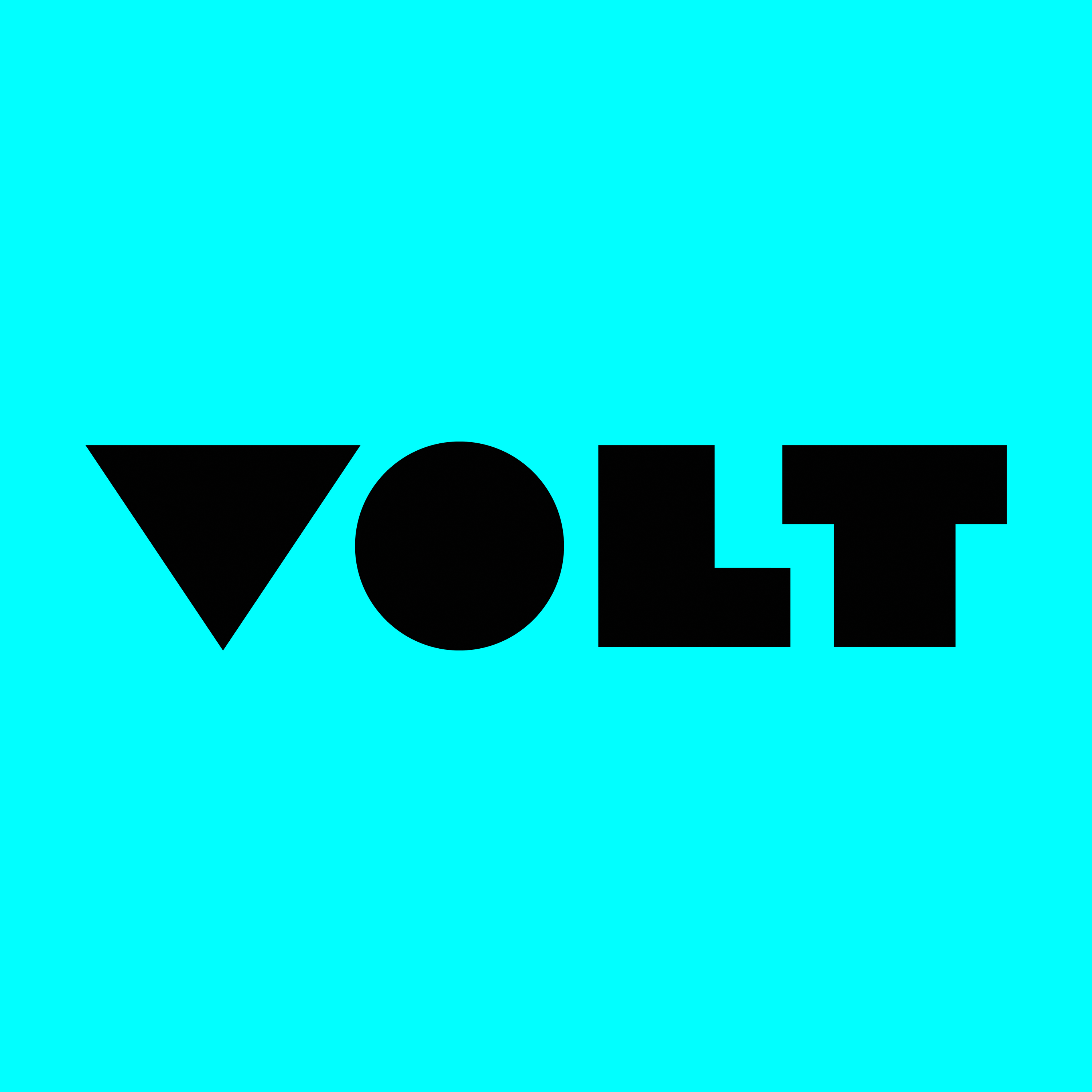
- Company type: Unlisted public company
- Traded as: Volt Bank
- Industry: Banking, Financial services
- Founded: 2017
- Defunct: 2022
- Headquarters: Sydney, Australia
- Area served: Worldwide
- Key people: Steve Weston (CEO)
- Number of employees: 100
- Website: voltbank.com.au

Volt Bank was an Australian consumer neobank, the first such bank to be issued with a restricted ADI licence by APRA. In June 2022, the bank announced it would permanently close its deposit-taking business and voluntarily return its banking licence, citing funding issues.

Headquartered in Sydney, Australia, the bank was founded in 2017 and was granted a full licence to operate as an authorised deposit-taking institution (ADI) on 21 January 2019. Volt used BSB 517000.

== Business ==
Volt's banking platform is located in the cloud using the Temenos T24 core banking, Financial Crime Mitigation and Analytics, Salesforce and Microsoft Azure.

Volt Bank also has industry partnerships with PayPal, Cotton On and Collection House.

The bank publishes a mobile app, Volt Labs App, through which customers hold discussions and give feedback on the bank's products and services. The bank was planning to begin serving small businesses in 2020.

== History ==
The banking regulator, APRA, created the restricted ADI (RADI) licensing framework to encourage new entrants and competition to the existing banking system.

Volt Bank was issued with a RADI licence on 7 May 2018, the first organisation to obtain one under the new licensing framework. In doing so, it became the first completely new institution to be licensed as retail bank in the Australian market since Australian Bank in February 1981.

On 29 June 2022, in an email to its customer base, Volt announced their intention to cease their deposit-taking business and return their banking licence, the second neo bank to do so, following Xinja. Accounts held with Volt will be closed on 5 July 2022.

== See also ==
- Banking in Australia
- List of banks in Australia
- Digital banking
