= Banking and Payments Federation Ireland =

Banking representative body in Ireland

- Abbreviation: BPFI
- Formation: 2014; 12 years ago
- Legal status: Not for profit trade association
- Location: Dublin, Ireland
- Region served: Ireland
- Chief Executive: Brian Hayes
- Website: bpfi.ie

Banking and Payments Federation Ireland (BPFI) is a trade association for the banking and payments sector in Ireland. It represents domestic and international member institutions operating in the Irish market.

Alongside its affiliate organisations, the Fintech and Payments Association of Ireland (FPAI) and the Federation of International Banks in Ireland (FIBI), BPFI represents the interests of banking, payments and fintech in Ireland.

BPFI also represents the Irish banking and payments sector at European and international levels through its membership of the European Banking Federation.

== History ==
BPFI was formed in 2014 from the merger of the Irish Payment Services Organisation with the Irish Banking Federation (IBF). Its predecessor, the Irish Banking Federation, was founded in 1973 upon Ireland's accession to the European Communities.

== Operations ==
The organisation engages with domestic and European institutions on issues affecting the operating environment for its members, including regulatory and policy matters.

Brian Hayes has been BPFI Chief Executive since 2019 and also serves on the Executive Committee of the European Banking Federation.
