= Xinja =

Australian fintech company and former bank

Xinja Bank Limited
- Traded as: Xinja
- Industry: Banking; Finance; Fintech
- Headquarters: 77 King Street, Sydney
- Key people: Eric Wilson (CEO)

Xinja is an Australian fintech company and former bank. Xinja was granted a full banking license by the Australian Prudential Regulation Authority in 2019. Xinja Bank was the second Australian neobank to be made an authorised deposit-taking institution. The company exited banking in December 2020 and returned to business in fintech.

== History ==
Xinja was founded in 2017 by CEO Eric Wilson. The business began in fintech, offering products like prepaid cards and a money management app. In 2018, Xinja raised money via crowdfunding to develop its neobanking facilities. On 9 September 2019, Xinja was granted a banking licence by the Australian Prudential Regulation Authority. On 15 January 2020, Xinja Bank launched transaction and savings accounts using the BSB 775-775. In March 2020, the Dubai-based World Investments agreed to make a A$433,000,000 investment in Xinja Bank. Complications caused by the COVID-19 pandemic ultimately obstructed the Emirati investment and undermined Xinja Bank. In December 2020, Xinja announced that it would return its banking licence and return all deposits, ceasing to operate as a bank in Australia, though continuing its fintech business.

== See also ==
- Banking in Australia
- List of banks
- List of banks in Australia
- List of banks in Oceania
