= BPAY =

Australian electronic bill payment system

BPAY Group Pty Ltd
- Trade name: BPAY
- Type: Private
- Industry: Financial services
- Founded: 1997; 29 years ago
- Headquarters: Australia
- Products: Electronic funds transfer, Electronic bill payment
- Parent: Cardlink Services Limited
- Website: www.bpay.com.au

BPAY (BPAY Group Holding Pty Ltd) is an Australian electronic bill payment SaaS company which facilitates payments made through a financial institution's online, mobile or telephone banking facility to organisations which are registered BPAY billers.

BPAY is the registered trading name of BPAY Pty Ltd, a wholly owned subsidiary of Cardlink Services Limited. Cardlink is a self-regulating organisation owned equally by the four major Australian banks: Australia & New Zealand Banking Group, Commonwealth Bank, National Australia Bank and Westpac.

In September 2021, the Australian Competition & Consumer Commission (ACCC) authorised the amalgamation of BPAY Group, eftpos and NPP Australia under a new holding entity, Australian Payments Plus (AP+).

== History ==
BPAY was launched, on 18 November 1997, as an electronic bill payment system for bill payments by phone. It was the world's first single bill payment service adopted across a national banking sector. In 1998, 16% of Australian households had residential internet service; ten years on, the figure had risen to 67%. BPAY is considered a driver for online banking.

In 2001, 56% of payments were authorized by phone, and 44% were executed online. By 2007, 76% of payments were performed online, while 24% were initiated by phone.

In 2002, BPAY View was introduced, which delivers bills and statements electronically to participating Australian financial institutions, which then send an SMS or email to the customer who would go onto the internet banking site to authorise payment.

As of January 2015, BPAY payments can be made through more than 156 participating Australian banks, credit unions and financial institutions. More than 45,000 businesses accept payments using BPAY and each month approximately 30 million bills to the value of $24 billion are paid using BPAY. In 2022, BPAY was offered by over 60,000 businesses.

In the spring of 2021, Osko assigned a change in strategy at the New Payments Platform (NPPA) as the trigger for its write-down of Osko. That September, the Australian Competition & Consumer Commission (ACCC) authorised the proposed merger of Eftpos with BPAY Group Holding Pty Ltd and NPP Australia Ltd, better known as the NPPA.

== How BPAY works ==
BPAY operates in a manner similar to Mastercard and Visa credit cards, by contractually obligating participating financial institutes to each other.

=== Billers ===
Businesses and other organisations in Australia participate in BPAY as billers after registering with BPAY Pty Ltd. through their individual banking institution. A biller must also have an Australian Company Number (ACN) or Australian Business Number (ABN), and a bank account at an Australian financial institution. Billers designate the bank account to which amounts received are to be deposited, as well as the account to which fees are to be charged.

BPAY allocates a BPAY biller number to each client business. The biller includes the BPAY logo and biller number on their bills, as well as the reference number that a customer would use when making a payment.

The biller usually pays a fee to its bank, and the credit card company, when a card is used by customers in payment.

=== Making payments ===
To make payments using BPAY, the payee must be a customer of a participating Australian financial institution and be registered for any of its online, mobile or telephone banking services. The customer does not need to register for the BPAY service itself to make a payment using BPAY. They are usually not required to pay a fee for using the BPAY service.

== BPAY View ==
BPAY View was introduced in 2002. To be part of the system, a BPAY biller would also need to register for the BPAY View service. The biller would then include the BPAY View logo on its bills. The customer, on receiving the bill, may then go onto their financial institution's internet banking site or app to register the bill. Once registered, the bills are delivered electronically by the biller to participating Australian financial institution, which then sends an SMS or email to the customer, who would go onto the financial institution's internet banking site to view the bill and authorise payment.

== Osko by BPAY ==
Osko by BPAY was launched in September 2018, under the New Payments Platform, and allows payments to be sent and received between participating financial institutions in less than a minute every day, throughout the day. In addition to use of the traditional BSB and account number, payments can also be made using another person's PayID, which can be a registered mobile number, email address or ABN, that is linked to the recipient's bank account. To transfer funds to the account the transferor can use the PayID instead of the BSB and account number.
