= Citibank Australia =

Australian subsidiary of Citigroup

- Company type: Division
- Industry: Banking
- Founded: 1985; 41 years ago
- Fate: Acquired by National Australia Bank
- Headquarters: Sydney, Australia
- Area served: Australia
- Key people: Mark Woodruff (CEO)
- Parent: Citigroup

Citibank Australia was the division of Citigroup that operated in Australia. In June 2022, the division was sold to National Australia Bank.

== History ==
In 1916, National City Bank (now Citibank) applied to open an office in Australia.

In 1977, Citicorp Australia Holdings was formed and acquired 100% of Industrial Acceptance Corporation.

In 1985, Citibank was one of a group of 16 foreign banks to be granted the first foreign banking licences in Australia. It came after decades of mistrust between the Australian labour movement and large banks.

In 1999, Diners Club Australia was acquired by Citibank.

In 2001, Citigroup Centre, Sydney was completed, 50% owned by GPT Group.

On 1 June 2022, Citigroup sold its Australian consumer banking division to the National Australia Bank (NAB), for A$1.2 billion (US$882 million).

NAB advised Citibank Australia account holders that they can continue using their accounts as usual after 1 June 2022 and that accounts will be progressively transitioned to NAB over the next two to three years.

On 14 April 2023, holders of Citibank Global Currency and Multi Currency Accounts were emailed a letter (using Citi letterhead but NAB legal terms) advising that NAB is unable to offer an account with similar features and that accounts will be closed from 18 May 2023.

Deposit, home loan and investment accounts were closed and the balance transferred to an NAB branded account on 24 February 2024.

Citi branded Credit Cards and Citi Ready Credit accounts moved to a new "MyCard" brand on 24 November 2025.

== See also ==
- Banking in Australia
- List of banks
- List of banks in Australia
- List of banks in Oceania
