= Databank Systems =

Financial computing shared service

Databank Systems Limited was the name of a not-for-profit "off balance sheet" company set up by a consortium of competing banks in New Zealand, to operate on what is nowadays termed a "Shared services Agency" basis, to provide computing resources (development and operational) for the consortium members. The company was set up in 1967, and in 12 years grew to be the largest non-Government data processing organisation in the Southern Hemisphere, servicing more than 1,200 banking offices.

== Purpose ==
The purpose of Databank was defined within a set of contractual obligations in the 1969 Processing Agreement. The Agreement was between the consortium members, and was essentially about the services and service levels to be provided by Databank, and the constraints that would exist to ensure that lead bank ownership of any new application/system, and bank competitiveness, were maintained.

== History ==
The formation of Databank came at a time when computer systems were a scarce and expensive commodity in New Zealand, with the import of computers being restricted by the Second National Government (a conservative but highly regulatory government). Computers (like many items) could only be imported under licence. The executive management of the BNZ (Bank of New Zealand) wanted to obtain a computer and establish a computerised system to automate the processing of its banking transactions and customer accounting. Computerisation was deemed the only way to proceed if the increasing cheque transaction volumes were to be accommodated promptly. The other, smaller banks were approaching the point where they would face a similar situation. However, the NBNZ (National Bank of New Zealand) was the only one that happened to have a computer import licence.

Thus, the initial teaming-up was between the BNZ and NBNZ in 1966, and they set up Databank in 1967. The three other trading banks subsequently joined the consortium in 1968. Decimal currency was introduced in New Zealand on 10 July 1967.

=== Incorporation ===
Databank was incorporated in 1967 in Wellington, New Zealand, to deliver services to the then statutorily mandated trading banks of New Zealand. The founding CEO was Gordon Hogg (1930–2017); from the BNZ and known as the "bright brain" there. Ian Archibald was hired from the Bank of Scotland and worked closely with Gordon Hogg. Gordon worked well with Ian who was much more cautious. Gordon stayed at the company until he was obliged by the Databank Board to take early retirement in 1988.

The consortium of shareholder-customers of Databank had ownership distributed thus:

- BNZ – Bank of New Zealand (a state-owned bank at the time) – 40% share of Databank.
- NBNZ – National Bank of New Zealand (a subsidiary of Lloyds Bank, UK) – 20% share of Databank.
- ANZ – Australia-New Zealand Bank (an Australian-owned bank) – 20% share of Databank.
- BNSW – Bank of New South Wales (an Australian-owned bank) – 10% share of Databank.
- CBA – Commercial Bank of Australia (an Australian-owned bank) – 10% share of Databank.

By 1984, the consortium ownership of Databank had changed due to the merger of BNSW and CBA banks, thus:

- BNZ – Bank of New Zealand (a state-owned bank at the time) – 40% share of Databank.
- NBNZ – National Bank of New Zealand (a subsidiary of Lloyds Bank, UK) – 20% share of Databank.
- ANZ – Australia-New Zealand Bank (an Australian-owned bank) – 20% share of Databank.
- WBC – Westpac Banking Corporation (an Australian-owned bank) – 20% share of Databank.

== Operation ==
A national computerised network was set up with overnight processing of transactions, initially on IBM System/360 Model 40 computers. Money Transfer Services (MTS) were introduced in February 1969, and all branches of the trading banks were converted to computer processing by November 1969. In 1974/75 chequing accounts were introduced by the Post Office Savings Bank and several trustee savings banks.

In addition to processing for banks financial transactions, Databank also ran a service called Portran (Portable Fortran), with which school students could learn how to program a computer using punch cards.

The Fourth Labour Government elected in 1984 commenced a comprehensive restructuring of the New Zealand economy, including banking deregulation. Since Databank essentially owned the New Zealand payments system, which was operated through and by Databank, the existing clearing systems had to be opened up to new banks entering the market, to provide what was referred to as a "level playing field".

By 1988, Databank had become an increasingly large operational cost for the banks, who questioned whether they were continuing to receive value for money. A 1989 legal decision, that inter-company transactions (i.e., between Databank and the consortium members) must carry Goods and Services Tax meant that the long-term cost-effectiveness of Databank was no longer likely, and that it had become a financial risk. The decision was thus eventually taken by the banks to split off the core and common payments system processing of Databank and put it under the ownership of a new all-bank forum called ISL (Interchange and Settlement Ltd), and plans were put in place to dismantle Databank and sell it.

=== Sale and Closure ===
Between 1992 and 1994, all major development of new banking systems by Databank was aborted, the development projects were closed down and the associated personnel were retrenched. This was managed by the then CEO, Tony Hood, who had formerly been a Commercial Services Manager at Databank, and later the Chief Manager of IT at the Westpac Bank. He was appointed as CEO by the Board of Databank, and assigned the task of disposing of the company.

In 1994, Databank was sold to the US company Electronic Data Systems Corporation (EDS) – a General Motors Corporation subsidiary – for an undisclosed price. Tony Hood became the EDS CEO, resigning from EDS in 1996.

The Databank subsidiary, Databank Investments Ltd, was part of the job lot. At the time, Databank employed about 950 people. EDS' acquisition of Databank was intended to give it a base for further expansion, either by further takeovers or by selling services in the region.

A Commerce Commission report on the sale stated: "The proposed acquisition of Databank Systems Ltd is in line with Electronic Data Systems Corporation’s strategic plan for the Asia/Pacific area and will result in the establishment of a significant banking services organisation based in New Zealand. The Commission is advised there are plans to offer information technology services to non-banking customers as well."

About 25% of Databank’s turnover at the time was via its Commercial Services arm, to customers other than its four former owners.
