= National Stock Exchange of Australia =

Australian stock exchange

- Type: Stock exchange
- Location: Sydney, Australia
- Founded: 1937
- Owner: NSX Limited
- Key people: Mr Tod McGrouther (Chairman of NSXA); Mr Tim Hart (Non Exec)
- Currency: Australian dollar
- No. of listings: 75 (2019)
- Indices: NSX All Equities Index; NSX All Agriculture Index; NSX All Finance Index; NSX All Investment Index; NSX All Property Index; NSX All Resources Index; NSX All Technology Index
- Website: www.nsx.com.au

NSX Limited
- Company type: Public company
- Traded as: ASX: NSX
- Industry: Securities markets
- Founded: 1999, but dating back to 1937
- Headquarters: Sydney, Australia
- Key people: Mr Timothy J Hart (Chairman); Mr Max Cunningham (chief executive officer) /
- Owner: iSignthis Ltd (13%), Exchange Technology Investments Ltd (8%), Tiga Trading Pty Ltd (6.5%), Tony Sage (6%)
- Website: www.nsx.com.au

National Stock Exchange of Australia (NSX) is a stock exchange based in Sydney, New South Wales, Australia. It is owned and operated by NSX Limited, which is listed on the Australian Securities Exchange on 13 January 2005. On 20 December 2006 the Newcastle Stock Exchange formally sought approval and was granted a change of name by the minister to National Stock Exchange of Australia and still trades by the acronym of "NSX".

The NSX lists various companies within Australia and overseas that meet its listing rule requirements. Trading is all-electronic based on time and price priority using NETS (the NSX Electronic Trading System) which is based on the NASDAQ OMX X-stream trading platform. Settlement of securities is electronic and on a T+2 basis using the ASX Settlement and Transfer Corporation's ("ASTC") CHESS system.

== History ==
The NSX was founded in 1937 and in the past had listed as many as 300 local and regional companies. Some grew to be significant companies such as Golden Circle and Ricegrowers (SunRice). It was reactivated in its present form in 2000 with about 70 listed companies.

=== Timeline of significant events ===
- 1937: Newcastle Stock Exchange was formed.
- 1939: Newcastle Stock Exchange was officially recognised under the Act.
- 1940: J. J. Price, Newcastle Stock Exchange chairman, suspended all meetings until after the Second World War.
- 1947: Meetings recommenced.
- 1985: Meetings ceased.
- 2000: The Newcastle Stock Exchange was re-established.
- 2005: Acquired the Bendigo Stock Exchange (now called IR Plus Securities Exchange), including the operation of the BSX Taxi Market
- 2006: Newcastle Stock Exchange was renamed to National Stock Exchange of Australia Limited.
- 2007: Acquired The Water Exchange
- 2010: Sold The Water Exchange
- 2011: Operations of the BSX Taxi Market ceased
- 2016: Office and operations relocated to Sydney, Australia.

=== IR Plus Securities Exchange ===
NSX Limited acquired Bendigo Stock Exchange (BSX) on 12 April 2005. At the time the BSX facilitated the trading of Community Bank branches of Bendigo Bank in an uncertificated market. The BSX will be renamed SIM Venture Securities Exchange (2010) with the objective of listing securities that have cleantech credentials. The exchange is now known as IR Plus Securities Exchange.

=== Taxi market and national licence market ===
NSX created the first publicly tradeable taxi licence market in conjunction with the Victorian Taxi Directorate. The market started trading on 28 March 2006. Licences and temporary transfers were traded. The National Licence Exchange replicated the Taxi Market, but on a national basis. The National Licence Exchange ceased operations in 2011.

=== The Water Exchange ===
NSX Limited acquired The Water Exchange on 19 October 2007. The Water Exchange facilitated the trading of permanent and temporary water entitlements within Australia. In December 2010 NSX Limited announced the sale of The Water Exchange to Envex Water Limited.

== Trading systems ==
Both the NSX and IR Plus operate on international standard electronic trading systems and settlement is available electronically via ASX Clear CHESS system or manually for non-CHESS enrolled securities.

Settlement is on a T+2 basis.

=== Trading schedule ===
National Stock Exchange of Australia has a start-of-day enquiry session from 2:30 am to 3:00 am, a pre-open session from 3:00 am to 10:00 am, a normal trading session from 10:00 am to 4:15 pm, and a post-market session (end-of-day enquiry) from 4:15 pm to 11:00 pm (all times in AEST).

Current holidays: Australia Day (January), Good Friday, Easter Monday, Anzac Day (25 April), Queen's Birthday (June) and Christmas Day (25 December) and New Year's Day (1 January).

== Indices ==
Below is the list of all NSX indices:

- NSX All Equities Index
- NSX All Agriculture Index
- NSX All Community Index
- NSX All Finance Index
- NSX All Investment Index
- NSX All Property Index
- NSX All Resources Index
- NSX All Technology Index
- SIMVSE All Equities Index

== See also ==
- Economy of Australia
- List of stock exchanges
- List of stock exchanges in the Commonwealth of Nations
