= Bendigo Stock Exchange =

- BSX
- Location: Bendigo, Australia
- Coordinates: 36°45′43″S 144°16′53″E
- Founded: 6 October 2000
- Closed: June 2012

Bendigo Stock Exchange (BSX) was a small stock exchange based in Australia.

The exchange targeted its listing rules at small to medium-sized businesses and offered lower listing fees than the Australian Securities Exchange. It listed various small companies, property trusts, and community-based businesses (such as community bank franchises of the Bendigo Bank).

Trading was all-electronic, conducted by an order matching system in strict price time order. Trading hours were from 9.00am until 2.30pm each weekday after being aligned with Newcastle Stock Exchange hours. The trading system had been merged onto the NSX NETS platform where stockbrokers can trade either market.

== History ==
=== The first Bendigo stock exchange ===
The first Bendigo stock exchange was founded in the 1860s as the Sandhurst Mining Exchange – Bendigo was officially called Sandhurst from 1854 to 1891. The Sandhurst Mining Exchange listed shares in mining companies working the rich goldfields of Bendigo and surrounding areas.

The 1870s were the heyday of the exchange, business was booming, and special trains brought investors from Melbourne to buy shares. In November 1871, the exchange had over 1300 listed companies, with a total capitalization around £10,000,000.

The Great Depression of the 1930s hit the exchange hard, and World War II saw the closure of almost all mines.

In 1954, this original stock exchange closed.

=== The BSX ===
Efforts to revive the Bendigo Stock Exchange began in 1999 supported by Bendigo Bank and local businesses. This led to the BSX's approval as a market licensee on 6 October 2000.

NSX Limited, owner of the National Stock Exchange of Australia, acquired BSX on 12 April 2005.

In June 2012, NSX Limited, the owner of BSX, decided to shut the stock exchange down.

== See also ==
- List of stock exchanges in the Commonwealth of Nations
- List of stock exchanges
- Stockbroker
- Brokerage firm
