= Trust Bank of Tasmania =

Trust Bank of Tasmania Limited
- Trade name: Trust Bank
- Industry: Banking, financial services
- Predecessor: Savings Bank of Tasmania, Tasmania Bank
- Founded: 1 May 1991
- Defunct: 26 November 1999
- Fate: Merged with Colonial Bank
- Successor: Colonial Bank, Commonwealth Bank
- Headquarters: Hobart, Australia
- Area served: Tasmania
- Owner: Government of Tasmania

The Trust Bank of Tasmania (trading as Trust Bank) was a state bank operating in Tasmania, Australia. It was founded in 1991 from the merger of the Tasmania Bank and Hobart Savings Bank/Savings Bank of Tasmania. It was sold to Colonial Mutual in 1999.

== Foundation ==
During the mid-1980s, the Tasmanian Government attempted to create a single state bank by merging the two trustee banks, the Savings Bank of Tasmania and the Launceston Savings Bank. This failed, however; the Launceston Savings Bank eventually merged with the Perpetual Executors Building Society to form the Tasmania Bank in 1987. The Savings Bank of Tasmania continued to operate separately.

Poor lending strategies led the Tasmania Bank to crisis in 1989, and through financial injection by the state government and the inclusion of the Savings Bank of Tasmania, a merger was considered. The state government deliberated, and put forth the Trust Bank (Arrangements) Act 1991, which gained Royal Assent on 1 May 1991. The new company operated as a trustee bank structure like those of its predecessors.

The Trust Bank was an important institution within the state for its short period, through financial backing of local business and by community sponsorship. Trust Bank was official sponsor of the Tasmania cricket team in the late 1990s, and funded its own art prize. In 1997 Trust Bank was registered through the Australian Securities & Investments Commission and became a limited company corporation with shareholders. Regardless, Trust Bank had difficulty in maintaining competitiveness in the Australian capital market, especially during a time of large market share between rival credit unions and banks.

== Acquisition ==
On 16 November 1999, Colonial Mutual announced that it would acquire Trust Bank through its wholly owned subsidiary State Bank of New South Wales, for $149.1 million from the Tasmanian Government. At this time, Trust Bank had 40 branches statewide, and held more than 30% of the Tasmanian retail deposit market. 25% of outstanding loans in the state were through Trust Bank.

The state government was adamant about privatisation as a way of benefiting Tasmanians, and Colonial agreed to no job losses or branch closures. Trust Bank continued as Colonial Trust Bank. On 10 March 2000 the Commonwealth Bank and Colonial Mutual announced their intention to merge, which caused vocal concerns by the Tasmanian Labor government. The Federal Government argued that the Tasmanian government had to abide by competition policy. The Australian Competition & Consumer Commission did not oppose the merger. Up to 300 jobs and 30 branches were expected to close after the merger.

On 31 May 2000 the two banks merged, after the Commonwealth Bank appeased the Tasmanian Government by agreeing to establish either one or more call centres in Tasmania, to provide $4 million for computers in local schools and to maintain rural branches; although this agreement was only applicable for five years. The Commonwealth Bank now held over 50% of the Tasmanian banking market.

Trust Bank as a brand continued until the end of May 2000, when the Commonwealth Bank transferred accounts and policies to their division, and began integration of Colonial Trust Bank assets.

== Legacy ==
An inquiry into the sale of Trust Bank was established in Tasmania by the Parliamentary Standing Committee of Public Accounts. In it, the benefits of the sale were prescribed as a revenue of $5 million from stamp duty due to the sale, and $98.24 million had been used to reduce state debt. it was hoped a total of $134.1 million could be used in debt reduction. It also discussed pressure placed upon the directors of the Trust Bank, particularly in regards to funding and studies about information technology.

Today, no significant physical proof of the Trust Bank exists. Many old branches were sold off or re-branded Commonwealth Bank.

Following the sale, the state government passed the Trust Bank Sale Act 1999 on 26 November 2000, which repealed all laws related to the Bank and officially disbanded the board of directors. The Act also established the Tasmanian Community Fund using money from the sale of Trust Bank, and the fund continues today.
