= Routing number (Canada) =

Bank identification code

A routing number is the term for bank codes in Canada. Routing numbers consist of eight numerical digits with a dash between the fifth and sixth digit for paper financial documents encoded with magnetic ink character recognition and nine numerical digits without dashes for electronic funds transfers. Routing numbers are regulated by Payments Canada, formerly known as the Canadian Payments Association, to allow easy identification of the branch location and financial institution associated with an account.

== Format ==
A routing number consists of a five digit transit number (also called branch number) identifying the branch where an account is held and a three digit financial institution number corresponding to the financial institution. The number is given as one of the following forms, where XXXXX is the transit number and YYY is the financial institution number:

- XXXXX-YYY for MICR-encoded documents
- 0YYYXXXXX for electronic funds transfers

A leading zero is used when formatting a routing number for electronic payments.

=== Routing symbol ===
The symbol that delimits a routing number on MICR-encoded paper documents is the E-13B transit character (Unicode value U+2446): ⑆

=== Transit numbers ===
Each branch in a financial institution is assigned a unique transit number for identification. The format of the transit number may vary by institution.

Most institutions use the transit number and branch number synonymously. TD and Bank of Montreal use four-digit branch numbers, reserving the final digit of the transit number for the geographical location of the branch.

While there is variation between institutions, most transit numbers encode geographic region into the last digit using a pattern like:

- XXXX0 for British Columbia and Yukon
- XXXX1 for western Quebec, including Montreal. Some institutions include Gatineau here, others group it with XXXX6 Ottawa. (Note: The use of XXXX1 (western Quebec) vs XXXX6 (Ottawa) for branches in Gatineau varies between institutions and often between branches. Bank of Montreal and Scotiabank will often assign "6" suffixes in Hull and Gatineau to match the rest of Ottawa, although Quebec's "1" will sometimes appear. National Bank and Laurentian Bank consistently use western Quebec's "1" suffix for the Outaouais region.)
- XXXX2 for most of Ontario, including Toronto and Southern Ontario
- XXXX3 for Nova Scotia, Prince Edward Island. Some institutions list Newfoundland or Labrador here. (Note: Scotiabank and the small, independent credit unions place all of Newfoundland and Labrador in XXXX3. TD places Newfoundland in XXXX3 and Labrador in XXXX5. Bank of Montreal places the entire province in XXXX1.)
- XXXX4 for New Brunswick
- XXXX5 for eastern Quebec including Quebec City
- XXXX6 for Ottawa and its surrounding area.
- XXXX7 for Manitoba and north-western Ontario, including Thunder Bay.
- XXXX8 for Saskatchewan
- XXXX9 for Alberta, the Northwest Territories and Nunavut

Under this pattern, the first branch of the first bank to have national operations (Banque de Montréal, 119, rue Saint Jacques, Montréal) would have the branch number 0001, the region number 1 (due to being located in western Québec), and the institution number 001, yielding the MICR code 00011-001.

BMO and TD do not consider the fifth digit of the transit number to be part of the branch number and will not create five-digit codes for different branches which differ only in the final, fifth digit. (Note: Then and now: A look at TD branch transit 0001 (stories.td.com) lists Canada Trust's 1931-era Huron and Erie Mortgage Company building at 220 Dundas Street, London as "branch 0001". The weekly list from payments.ca assigns this branch 00012-004.) If Montreal is 00011-001 then the next site (First Canadian Place Toronto) is 00022-001, with 00012-001 remaining permanently unassigned. Likewise, the electronic routing number for a branch of either TD Bank or BMO will start with a 0, followed successively by the 3-digit institution number, the 4-digit branch number, and the single-digit number for the region in which the bank is located. For example, the routing number of a TD Bank branch with the branch number 1795 situated in Scarborough, Ontario, is 000417952: 0 [Start off] 004 [institution number] 1795 [branch number] 2 [because the branch is in Ontario].

RBC also uses four-digit branch numbers, but these include the last digit, with the transit numbers instead being padded with leading zeroes. (Note: A handful of non-branch RBC transit numbers use a leading "1" instead) While some older branches happen to adhere to the pattern above, it has been abandoned for many newer RBC branches, apparently to limit RBC's branch transit numbers to four digits.

Desjardins uses all five digits as significant with no region coding in the fifth digit. (Note: As Desjardins has historically split individual provinces into regions, often a sequential block of transit numbers in Desjardins Québec XXXXX-815 or Desjardins Ontario 00XXX-829 will be assigned to the same region. Nonetheless, all five digits are required to identify an individual local caisse in this system.)

Most small local credit unions use the institution number to indicate a "Credit Union Central" organisation for a specific province; the transit number indicates a specific branch of a specific member institution. As transit numbers are issued arbitrarily or sequentially, multiple branches of the same credit union typically do not get assigned a contiguous block of numbers. While the province may be embedded in the transit number, the info is superfluous; a small Ontario credit union will be XXXX2-828 regardless of its location in-province.

=== Financial institution numbers ===
A selection of institution numbers for major Canadian financial institutions is below. (Note: A full list is posted weekly each Friday on payments.ca with institution number and branch list.)

Bank Name	Institution Number
Bank of Montreal (operating as BMO)	001
Bank of Nova Scotia (operating as Scotiabank)	002
Royal Bank of Canada (operating as RBC)	003
Toronto-Dominion Bank (operating as TD Canada Trust)	004
National Bank of Canada	006
Canadian Imperial Bank of Commerce (CIBC includes Simplii Financial)	010
HSBC Canada	016
Canadian Western Bank	030
Laurentian Bank of Canada	039
Government of Canada (Note: Not a member of Payments Canada. The central bank 177 is a member and a direct clearer, but Government of Canada 117, Canada Post money orders 127 and Canada Savings Bond redemptions 187 are non-member codes. There are also a few privately-owned institutions listed before Payment Association membership was required to obtain new institution numbers; they have been allowed to keep those existing codes.)	117 (Note: Commonly seen on income tax refund cheques from the Canada Revenue Agency)
Canada Post (money orders)	127
Bank of Canada (Canadian central bank)	177
Canada Savings Bond (redemptions)	187
ATB Financial	219
MUFG Bank, Canada Branch	245
Citibank Canada	260
Mega International Commercial Bank Canada	269
JPMorgan Chase Bank, N.A. (Toronto Branch)	270
Bank of China (Canada)	308
Vancity Community Investment Bank (Note: Occasionally an institution will structure itself as a credit union owning a bank or trust company, a trust company owning a bank, a bank owning a trust company or some similar combination. This gives multiple institution numbers, such as TD Canada Trust on 004 and 509. Credit unions and caisses populaires are normally assigned in the 800 range, while trust and loan institution numbers are typically in the 500's or low 600's. Vancity appears as a Central 1 BC member credit union which owns a captive, branchless bank. The subsidiary has its own rarely-used institution number 175X0-309. The individual Vancity branches are listed not there but under Central 1's XXXX0-809 code as the Vancouver City Savings credit union.)	309
First Nations Bank of Canada	310
CTBC Bank (Canada)	315
President's Choice Bank (Note: Not affiliated with President's Choice Financial's former consumer banking operations. After the closure of CIBC-owned Amicus Bank (1999-2003), PC Financial's bank accounts were operated directly by CIBC using that bank's 010 institution number. Following the end of PC Financial and CIBC's joint venture, all PC Financial consumer bank accounts were transferred to Simplii Financial. (All Simplii accounts are coded as CIBC branch 30800-010.))	320
Canadian Tire Bank	338
ICICI Bank Canada	340
Digital Commerce Bank	352
Canada Trust Company (for accounts opened prior to the TD Canada Trust merger) (Note: The lists of routing codes are littered with dead branches or entire institutions whose branch networks no longer exist due to branch closures, mergers and acquisitions. Canada Trust's Kingston main branch was MICR 11392-509; TD had its own branch 01392-004. Post-merger closures of duplicate branches pointed both codes (and some others in TD's 004 range, flagged as "Sub to 01392") to the former Canada Trust building. On paper, Canada Trust and its pre-merger depositor accounts still exist, but all new accounts are being assigned TD numbers. If a branch network no longer exists (such as National Trust, after a takeover by Scotiabank) the routing code may be in the table but redirected in some manner. National Trust's former 353 Bay Street Toronto main branch 059000012 is listed with Scotiabank MICR code 34272-002 (the bank's 392 Bay Street branch). Expect more of the same where an institution is a going concern but is aggressively closing branches; routing codes for defunct CIBC branches in Tamworth and Deseronto point to a Greater Napanee Area branch which is still open. Sometimes the table lists the original street address (even if there's nothing there now) or the location of the nearest functional cashpoint, sometimes it lists the address of the branch to which the accounts were transferred, sometimes it lists "Sub to" and the destination branch's transit or routing number. Even if a branch no longer exists, the client list is commercially valuable so an attempt is usually made to point the code somewhere.)	509
Manulife Bank	540
Alterna Bank	608
Tangerine Bank (formerly ING Direct Canada)	614
B2B Bank	618
Wise_(company)	621
Equitable Bank (includes EQ Bank)	623
Wealthsimple (for its bank-like Cash accounts)	703
Central 1 Credit Union member institutions in British Columbia	809
Caisses Desjardins du Québec	815
Caisse Populaire financial group (Manitoba)	819
Central 1 Credit Union member institutions in Ontario	828
Caisses populaires Desjardins de l'Ontario	829
Meridian Credit Union (Note: Desjardins Credit Union, he former Province of Ontario Savings Office, sold to Desjardins in 2003, was merged into Meridian Credit Union in 2011 and its former institution code 239 revoked. Where an institution no longer exists (not even as a subsidiary of another firm), the code is normally expected to be shut down within a year - allowing time for items currently in the system to be processed - and then reserved for at least ten years before being issued to anyone else, if they're reissued at all.) (Note: Meridian Credit Union and Alterna Savings no longer qualify for membership in the Canadian Payments Association, because they are Central 1 member credit unions. Both institutions are the product of mergers; Meridian XXXX2-837 replaced Hepcoe Credit Union (#837) and Niagara Credit Union (not a member) in 2005 while Alterna XXXX2-842 replaced CS-Coop (Civil Service Co-operative Credit Society, #842) and Metro Credit Union (not a member) in 2005. Normally, membership in the Payments Association is revoked when a firm disappears due to a merger or becomes a member of a credit union central. As an exception, these two respective codes remain active at the request of Central 1, which is a member of the payments association and is legally responsible for their operation. (Different rules apply if an institution is acquired as a subsidiary, legally Alterna Bank is separate from its owner Alterna Savings, retaining its own payments association membership and institution number.))	837
Atlantic Central member institutions (Note: The former Credit Union Central of Nova Scotia XXXX3-839 code also includes member institutions in Newfoundland, Labrador and Prince Edward Island as Atlantic Central is the product of a merger which included credit union central groups in New Brunswick XXXX4-849 and Prince Edward Island. PEI's 813code has been retired, but 849 has been left active indefinitely for Atlantic Central members in New Brunswick.)	839
Alterna Savings and Credit Union (Note: Alterna Savings 842 is a credit union which owns the direct-banking operation Alterna Bank 608. There are no branches (other than the Ottawa headquarters) assigned to either of these codes, as all of Alterna's branches are listed in XXXX2-828 as Central 1 member Ontario credit unions. As Ontario's credit unions historically were small offices founded by tiny local groups with a common bond, such as the workers at one specific workplace, the large institutions like Alterna and Meridian tend to be the product of ongoing acquisitions, mergers and takeovers. The handling of existing routing codes after a credit union is taken over varies; Alterna will leave the existing 828 code intact (if present), Meridian will assign its own 837 institution code to the acquired branch, Kawartha CU will renumber every account in the acquired institution to a new account number in 06322-828, its Hunter Street corporate headquarters in Peterborough - forcing members to obtain new cheques, acquire new ATM cards and lose the ability to view any transactions from before the takeover on Member Direct's online banking site.)	842
Atlantic Central (Brunswick Credit Union Federation)	849
Caisses populaires acadiennes (New Brunswick)	865
Central 1 (former Credit Union Central of Canada) (Note: Central 1 operates the Credit Union Central for BC XXXX0-809 and Ontario XXXX2-828. It has also assumed the clearing group position formerly held by the national Credit Union Central organisation. Central 1 869 is one of two group clearers providing access to the payments system for other credit union groups, the other being Desjardins 815. While the largest banks (and the central bank) are direct clearers, it is not uncommon for smaller institutions to rely on one of the big banks or on an organisation like Central 1 869 for some or all access to the system. As these clients (or provincial groups) hold their own respective institution codes, that code (and not 869) appears on their cheques and individual items; 869 is only used internally in routing table entries.)	869
Credit Union Central of Manitoba member institutions	879
Credit Union Central of Saskatchewan (SaskCentral) member institutions	889
Credit Union Central of Alberta member institutions	899

== Directories of routing numbers ==
Payments Canada maintains the Financial Institutions File (FIF), an electronic directory of routing numbers for all financial institutions in Canada. The FIF is updated weekly and is operated as a fee-based subscription service to member institutions of Payments Canada.

A companion free-of-charge directory, the Financial Institutions Branch Directory (FIBD), is also operated by Payments Canada for occasional referencing by the general public. The FIBD is only available in PDF format and cannot be imported into business applications.

== See also ==
- International Bank Account Number
- ABA routing transit number, American bank code format
- Bank State Branch, Australian bank code format
- Bankleitzahl, Austrian and German bank code format
- New Zealand bank account prefix
- Sort code, British and Irish bank code formats
