= Bank clearing number =

Number used to identify institutions

A bank clearing number or BC number is a number used for the identification of financial institutions in Switzerland and Liechtenstein. Bank clearing numbers are connected to the Swiss Interbank Clearing and the euroSIC system.

Bank clearing numbers consists of 3 to 5 digits. To identify a particular branch of a financial institution clearly, a store ID is specified in addition to the bank clearing number.

== List of bank clearing numbers ==
The first digit of the bank clearing number represents the institution:

Digit	Institute
1	Swiss National Bank
2	UBS AG
3	reserved
4	Credit Suisse Group AG
5	Neue Aargauer Bank
6	Regionalbanken der RBA-Holding AG
7	Cantonal bank
8	Raiffeisen (Switzerland)
9	PostFinance

== See also ==
- Sort code
- Bank Identifier Code (ISO 9362)
