= International Programme on the State of the Ocean =

The International Programme on the State of the Ocean (IPSO) focuses on the many factors that threaten the health of Earth's oceans. The organization is managed as a not for profit company registered in the United Kingdom. It is hosted by the Zoological Society of London. Dr. Alex Rogers is the Scientific Director of IPSO and Professor of Conservation Biology at the Department of Zoology, University of Oxford.

== Areas of research ==
- Effects of climate change on oceans
- Overfishing
- Ocean acidification
- Habitat destruction of marine lifeforms
- Fisheries and climate change
- Detrimental resource extractions
- Marine pollution
- Introduced species in marine environments
