= Australian securities law =

Financial services legislation

Australian securities law relates to securities issued by corporations as well as other securities, including debentures, stocks and bonds issued by governments, and interests in managed investment schemes.

Australian securities regulation rests on the principle that "financial markets cannot function effectively unless participants act with integrity and there is adequate disclosure to facilitate informed judgements". As a result, many of the regulatory rules governing dealings in securities are part of a broader framework that governs financial products, financial services and financial markets.

Mandatory disclosure and conduct regulation underlie much of Australia's securities regulation. False trading, fraudulent dealing, and insider trading are dealt with to prevent improper practices in connection with securities markets. A licensing system operates to ensure securities markets are fair, orderly and transparent. At the same time, securities law is also facilitative, allocating rights and duties in conjunction with general contract law. It also allows for a degree of self-regulation, by the operation for example of an independent securities exchange.

Australian securities law has been substantially modernised in recent years. The core of these laws are found in the Corporations Act 2001 (Cth), which contains provisions governing takeovers, fundraising, and financial products, services and markets.

== Legal and regulatory framework ==
The main body of substantive law about securities is found in the Corporations Act 2001 (Cth), as well as the regulations made under that Act. Whilst much of the law is derived from earlier regulation (especially the bust in Australian mineral stocks of the late 1960s), the sections relating to securities regulation have been subject to recent amendment. The takeovers provisions were substantially re-written by the Corporation Law Economic Reform Program Act 1999. Changes to financial products, financial markets, and financial services were introduced by the Financial Services Reform Act 2001 (Cth), as a result of the Final Report of the Financial System Inquiry, commonly referred to as "the Wallis report."

Elements of securities law are also found in the general law governing contracts, trusts, and torts. Securities regulation under the Corporations Act operates against the background of other Commonwealth legislation on criminal law, administrative law, and statutory interpretation.

Administration of the legislation is the responsibility of the Commonwealth Treasurer and the Australian Securities and Investments Commission (ASIC), according to the Australian Securities and Investments Commission Act 2001 (Cth) and the Corporations Act 2001 (Cth). The market operator Australian Stock Exchange also has an important regulatory role to play.

The resolution of disputes is confided to the Federal Court and the Supreme Courts of the States and the Northern Territory, with other courts having some powers to apply the securities legislation.

== Definitions ==
A security is "a thing in action", a claim enforceable by legal proceedings rather than owning some tangible property. To effect regulation the legislation adopts various definitions of "security" and "financial product" that are used.

There is also no law which stipulates that no person in which authority is not given (anyone other the law enforcement or owners of an establishment) may restrict persons entering and leaving a premises.

== Licensing ==
Only the holder of a market licence may operate a financial market.

=== Financial intermediaries ===
A person who carries on a financial services business in the jurisdiction must hold an Australian financial services licence.

== Market misconduct ==
Prevention of fraud and other forms of market misconduct has its foundation in the efficient-market hypothesis.

General common law prohibitions against interfering with the free public market are strengthened by statutory prohibitions against various forms of market misconduct.

One set of statutory prohibitions is upon trading activity which manipulates market prices. There are further prohibitions upon conduct that involves false trading or market rigging.
