= Australian Payments Network =

Self-regulatory body

Australian Payments Network Limited
- Industry: Banking, Regulation
- Founded: 18 February 1992
- Headquarters: Sydney, Australia
- Key people: Andy White, CEO; John Brogden, Chair
- Website: www.auspaynet.com.au

Australian Payments Network Limited (AusPayNet), formerly the Australian Payments Clearing Association (APCA) is the self-regulatory body set up by the payments industry to improve the safety, reliability, equity, convenience and efficiency of payment systems in Australia.

AusPayNet has over 140 members which include Australia's leading financial institutions, such as banks, building societies and credit unions, as well as major retailers and other service providers.

AusPayNet administers a number of payment systems in Australia. AusPayNet sets, manages and develops regulations, procedures and standards governing payments clearing and settlement within Australia. Payments systems covered by AusPayNet's rules include cheques, direct debits and credits, aspects of ATM and EFTPOS transactions, high value payments and the distribution of wholesale cash. Its role includes strategic direction and regulatory policy for the Australian payments system.

AusPayNet provides a venue for collaboration and cross-industry innovation on these issues and works closely with government, regulators, payments stakeholders and individuals to improve the payments system.

AusPayNet is also the official issuer and custodian of Bank State Branch (BSB) numbers, the bank code system used in Australia. AusPayNet assigns the bank code to a financial institution who then allocates the other digits, in line with guidelines set by AusPayNet. AusPayNet also manages the Magnetic ink character recognition (MICR) cheque encoding standards in Australia.

== Objectives ==
The objective of AusPayNet is to improve the Australian payments system through:

- enabling competition and innovation
- promoting efficiency
- controlling risk.

AusPayNet's roles include providing:

- thought leadership and advocacy
- industry collaboration
- self-regulation
- system-wide standards.

== Australian Paper Clearing System ==
The Australian Paper Clearing System (APCS) is the system that facilitates the exchange and settlement of cheques and other paper-based payments in Australia, under the governance of the APN.

== History ==
AusPayNet was founded as the Australian Payments Clearing Association (APCA)

AusPayNet was called APCA when established on 18 February 1992 as a self-regulatory industry body charged with carrying forward the process of payments reform. In its early years, it focused on re-grouping payment services into distinct clearing systems and developing and managing rules and procedures for their day-to-day operation. In its next phase, the company took responsibility for managing projects and for contingency planning, certification and accreditation. These kinds of activities remain core business for AusPayNet.

It took over the regulation and management of the BSB system, which had been in operation since the 1970s. In 2017, the company celebrated its 25th anniversary as the payments industry's self-regulatory body and changed its name to Australian Payments Network (AusPayNet).

On 1 January 2014, it adopted a new Constitution designed to recognise the growing diversity of interests in payments arising from structural and technological change and to provide a more inclusive and representative association of the Australian payments system. The new Constitution opened AusPayNet membership to participants and operators of non-AusPayNet payment systems.

== Fraud ==
AusPayNet has been publishing cheque and card fraud statistics since November 2006 as part of the payment industry's commitment to counter payments fraud and to help the public in understanding payments fraud issues. The payment fraud figures for 2016 show that Australian card fraud is increasing as part of a global trend, but that detection and prevention measures employed by the industry are showing promising results in keeping fraud levels down.

Transaction fraud declined by 15% in 2019, the first decline in eight years, whilst "strong growth" was noted in card use over the same year. In December 2021, AusPayNet released data showing a 9.2% rise of fraud in payment card transactions during increased online spending, concurrent with COVID-19 lockdowns, for the 12 months ending 30 June 2021.

== Projects ==
In 2011, the company began a public consultation period to gain feedback on the future role of cheques in Australia.

In May 2012 the company released the final report from its consultation entitled "The Decline of Cheques: Building a Bridge to the Digital Economy". The report summarises the outcomes of the consultation process and includes a series of Recommendation and Commitments to ensure those that still rely on cheques today can switch to electronic payments as cheques become scarcer and more difficult to use. AusPayNet regularly releases Milestones Reports, to track progress against the Recommendations and Commitments. One recent report, released in August 2014, featured a special focus on cash use. The latest Report, was released in May 2017.

In July 2013, the company announced a new industry-wide program to develop a New Payments Platform (NPP) for Australia and established NPP Australia Limited in December 2014 to oversee its development and operation.

AusPayNet is supporting Australia's first Contactless Transport Payments trial launched by Transport NSW on 6 July 2017.

== See also ==
- ATMIA
