= Authorised deposit-taking institution =

Permitted financial institutions in Australia

Financial institutions in Australia are only permitted to accept deposits from the public if they are authorised deposit-taking institutions (ADIs). The ADI’s authority is granted by the Australian Prudential Regulation Authority (APRA) under the Banking Act 1959 (Cth).

The term was adopted to formalise the right of non-bank financial institutions — such as building societies, credit unions and friendly societies — to accept such deposits. All ADIs are subject to the same prudential standards as banks but for a corporation to use word 'bank', 'building society' and 'credit union' in its name, it must meet certain requirements.

The concept of an ADI replaced that of "bank" following the recommendations of the Wallis Report in March 1997.

The statutory requirements of an ADI are elucidated in case Commissioners of the State Savings Bank of Victoria v Permewan, Wright & Co Ltd (1914). The case was seminal in characterising essential elements of a bank as being the collection of money by receiving deposits upon loan, repayable when and as expressly or impliedly agreed upon, and the utilisation of the money by lending it again in such sums as are required. If this is the institution's real and substantial business, and not merely an ancillary or incidental branch of another business, they are deemed to be a bank.

== Restricted ADI ==
On 4 May 2018, APRA created a restricted ADI (RADI) framework to assist potential new entrants to the banking industry, particularly small firms with limited financial resources, to navigate the licensing process. Eligible entities can conduct a limited range of business activities for two years. On 7 May 2018, APRA issued the first RADI to Volt Bank.

== Australian government deposit guarantee ==
Since 2008, as part of the response to the 2008 financial crisis, the Australian government set up the Financial Claims Scheme (FCS) to provide protection to depositors in ADIs in the event that an ADI fails. The FCS guarantees certain deposits (currently up to $250,000 for each account holder at any ADI incorporated in Australia). All deposits held by an account holder with a single financial institution are added together towards the FCS limit, including accounts with any other business that the ADI operates under a different trading name.

Initially, there was uncertainty as to whether deposits in foreign-owned banks were covered by the FCS, leading to a great outflow of funds from these banks. The government clarified that Australian-incorporated subsidiaries of foreign banks in Australia are covered in the same way as local banks.

== See also ==
- Banking in Australia
- Financial institution
- Money services business
- Non-bank financial institution
