= Sort code =

Bank transfer codes in the UK and Ireland

Sort codes are the domestic bank codes used to route money transfers between financial institutions in the United Kingdom, and formerly in Ireland. They are six-digit hierarchical numerical addresses that specify clearing banks, clearing systems, regions, large financial institutions, groups of financial institutions and ultimately resolve to individual branches. In the UK they continue to be used to route transactions domestically within clearance organizations and to identify accounts, while in Ireland (a founder member of the Euro) they have been deprecated and replaced by the Single Euro Payments Area (SEPA) systems and infrastructure.

The sort code is usually formatted as three pairs of numbers, for example 12-34-56. It identifies both the bank (in the first digit or the first two digits) and the branch where the account is held. Sort codes are encoded into International Bank Account Numbers (IBANs) but are not encoded into Business Identifier Codes (BICs).

Sort codes for Northern Ireland branches of banks (codes beginning with a '9') were registered with the Irish Payment Services Organization (IPSO) for both Northern Ireland and the Republic of Ireland. These codes are used in the British clearing system and historically in the Irish system.

== History ==
Codes began to be used in the early 20th century to facilitate the manual processing of cheques. Known as a 'national code', these had between three and five digits.

The eleven London clearing banks were each allocated a main number, with the "big five" (and the Bank of England) allocated single-digit numbers alphabetically. Lloyds Bank, for example, was allocated 3 and National Provincial was allocated 5. The remaining single digit codes were used to indicate that a cheque was from outside the London clearing system. The smaller clearing banks were allocated two-digit numbers, for example Martins Bank was allocated 11.

The bank branches were allocated further digits by their bank to make up the entire number; some banks represented these on cheques in smaller type. Main clearing branches (usually major London branches) would have only one digit after the main number, e.g. 111. Metropolitan branches (which covered Greater London) had two digits after the main number, e.g. 1124. Country branches made up the rest of the country, and used three or more digits after the main number, e.g. 11056. They were displayed on cheques in this fashion, with the bank identifier taking precedence.

Six-digit "sorting codes" were introduced in a staggered process from 1957 as the banking industry moved towards automation. The national codes were retained, but where a single digit was used to identify the bank a two-digit range was introduced. So, for example, Barclays codes went from starting with a 2 to 20, Midland from 4 to 40, etc.

Clearing bank code allocations
Code	Bank
1	Bank of England
2	Barclays
3	Lloyds Bank
4	Midland Bank
5	National Provincial
6	Westminster Bank
7	Walks
8	Scottish clearing
9	Irish clearing
11	Martins Bank
15	Glyn, Mills & Company
16	Williams Deacon's Bank
17	National Bank
18	Coutts

== List of sort codes of the United Kingdom ==
In the United Kingdom the initial digits of bank sort codes were originally allocated to settlement members of the Cheque and Credit Clearing Company and the Belfast Bankers' Clearing Company. Today, sort codes are issued to any organisation that will be a direct member of a UK electronic payment network (in addition to the cheque clearing systems, this includes Bacs, Faster Payments and CHAPS). Non-standard sort codes are issued to payment service providers who need an IBAN, for example for SEPA, as the sort code forms part of this.

The allocation of sort codes is managed by Bacs. These numbers are six digits long, formatted as three pairs separated by hyphens.

=== Cheque clearing ===
The cheque clearing system in the United Kingdom is managed by Pay.UK, following the merger of the Cheque and Credit Clearing Company, Bacs and Faster Payments Ltd in 2018. Since August 2019, sterling cheque clearing has been through the Image Clearing System.

=== England and Wales ===
In the following list the dates in brackets give the year of merger with the present-day sort code holder, or its subsidiary.

Range	Bank	Note
00	For IBAN use only	
01	NatWest	Formerly District Bank (1962)
04	"Utility bank"	04 is used by a large number of new financial institutions. Issued to new participants in the BACS, CHAPS and Faster Payments schemes. Not usable for cheques. See next table.
05	Nationwide Building Society	Formerly Yorkshire Bank, a division of Clydesdale Bank plc (2026). Trading as Virgin Money
07-00 to 07-49	Nationwide Building Society	
08	The Co-operative Bank	
08-60 to 08-61	The Co-operative Bank	For building societies (Note: Being phased out); 08-60-64 for Virgin Money (ex Northern Rock accounts)
08-90 to 08-99	The Co-operative Bank	
08-30 to 08-39	Citibank	08-31 to 08-32 for UK Government banking (NS&I, HMRC etc.)
09-00 to 09-19	Santander UK	Formerly Abbey National (2010)
09-00 to 09-19	Santander UK	09-01-31 to 09-01-36; 09-01-39 to 09-01-49 for Alliance & Leicester; 09-01-51 to 09-01-56 migrated accounts
10-00 to 10-79	Bank of England	Previously used for government banking and BoE employee accounts
11	Bank of Scotland	For Halifax (since 1990), earlier used by Martins Bank (1962-1969) See also 80–81 (Scotland), below.
12-00 to 12-69	Bank of Scotland	For Sainsbury's Bank
13	Barclays	
14	Barclays	
15	Royal Bank of Scotland	Formerly Williams & Glyn's Bank (1985), itself formerly Glyn, Mills & Company (1970)
15-80	Royal Bank of Scotland	For Child & Company private bank, part of The Royal Bank of Scotland (1923)
15-98 to 15-99	Royal Bank of Scotland	For C. Hoare & Co, independent private bank
16	Royal Bank of Scotland	Formerly Williams & Glyn's Bank (1985), itself formerly Williams Deacon's Bank (1970) 16-00-38 for Drummonds Bank, part of The Royal Bank of Scotland; 16-52-21 for the Cumberland Building Society; 16-57-10 for Cater Allen Private Bank, part of Santander Group
17	Royal Bank of Scotland	Formerly Williams & Glyn's Bank (1985), itself formerly The National Bank (1970)
18	Royal Bank of Scotland	For Coutts, a subsidiary of NatWest (1920)
19	Royal Bank of Scotland	
20 to 29	Barclays	20-11-47 for HMRC; 23-00-88 for VFX Financial; 23-05-05 for Stripe; 23-05-80 for Metro Bank; 23-14-70 for Wise; 23-22-21 for Fire Financial Services; 23-32-72 for Pockit; 23-59-54 for Newcastle Building Society; 23-69-72 for Prepay Technologies; 23-73-24 for Loot Financial Services
30 to 39	Lloyds Bank and TSB	Formerly Lloyds TSB (2013) and earlier for Lloyds Bank (1995) 30-00-66for Arbuthnot Latham Private Bank; 30-00-83for Al Rayan Bank; 30-02-48for FinecoBank UK
40 to 49	HSBC UK	Formerly Midland Bank (1992) 49-99-79 to 49-99-99 for Deutsche Bank; 40-12-50 to 40-12-55 for M&S Bank; 40-47-58 to 40-47-87 for First Direct; 40-51-78 for Jyske Bank Gibraltar; 40-51-98 for Turkish Bank UK; 40-60-80 for CashFlows; 40-63-01 for the Coventry Building Society; 40-63-77 for Cynergy Bank Limited; 40-64-05 to 40-64-16 for Tesco Bank; 40-64-25 for Virgin Money; 40-64-37 for Marcus
50 to 59	NatWest	Formerly National Provincial Bank (1968)
60 to 66	NatWest	Formerly Westminster Bank (1968) 60-01-73 for Reliance Bank Limited; 60-83-12 for Atom Bank; 60-83-14 for Gibraltar International Bank; 60-83-66 for Fidor Bank UK; 60-83-71 for Starling Bank; 60-84-00 for Zopa; 60-84-07 for Chase UK (JP Morgan) 60-93-03 for Weatherbys Bank Limited 60-95-34 for Handelsbanken UK personal accounts
70	Used by various international banks for their UK business: no longer issued.	Banks including: Bank of Baroda; National Bank of Pakistan; Close Brothers Group; Bank Hapoalim
71	Bank of England	National Savings Bank
72	Santander UK	Formerly Alliance & Leicester (2010), itself formerly Girobank (1985)
77-00 to 77-44	Lloyds Bank and TSB	Formerly Lloyds TSB (2013) and earlier for Trustee Savings Bank (1995)
77-46 to 77-99	Lloyds Bank and TSB	Formerly Lloyds TSB (2013) and earlier for Trustee Savings Bank (1995)

=== 04 codes ===
04 codes
Range	Bank	Note
04-00-02	BFC Bank	
04-00-03 to 04-00-08	Monzo	
04-00-11	Satabank	
04-00-40	Starling Bank	
04-00-53	Payrnet/Railsbank	
04-00-72 to 04-00-74	Modulr	
04-00-75 & 04-29-09	Revolut	
04-00-76	LCH Limited	
04-00-78	Elavon Financial Services	
04-00-79 to 04-00-80	Virgin Money head office	
04-03-00 to 04-03-29	LHV Pank	
04-03-33	Mettle by NatWest	
04-04-05	ClearBank	
04-04-76 to 04-04-77	Enumis	
04-05-40 to 04-05-41	BCB Group	
04-06-05	Tide (financial service) by ClearBank	
04-13-01	Midpoint & Transfer	
04-13-02 to 04-13-03	Bilderlings Pay	
04-13-04 to 04-13-05	Ecology Building Society	
04-13-06	Allpay Limited	
04-13-07 to 04-13-08	Clear Junction	
04-13-12	Modulr	
04-13-13 to 04-13-14	Project Imagine	
04-13-15 to 04-13-16	Universal Securities & Investment	
04-13-17 to 04-13-19	Contis Financial Services	
04-13-42	Duesday	
04-13-67	Monument Bank	
04-36-14 to 04-36-23	Griffin	

=== Scotland ===
Separately operated by the Committee of Scottish Clearing Bankers until 1985.

Range	Bank	Note
80 to 81	Bank of Scotland	80 to 81 Bank of Scotland Main Scotland range; see also code 11 (England and Wales), above.
82	Nationwide Building Society	Formerly Clydesdale Bank plc (2026). Trading as Virgin Money
83	Royal Bank of Scotland	formerly National Commercial Bank of Scotland (1969), formerly Commercial Bank of Scotland (1959)
84	Royal Bank of Scotland	formerly National Commercial Bank of Scotland (1969), formerly National Bank of Scotland (1959)
86	Royal Bank of Scotland	
87	TSB	formerly Lloyds TSB Scotland (2013) formerly TSB Scotland (1995)
89-00 to 89-29	Santander UK	formerly Alliance & Leicester (2010) formerly Girobank (2003)

=== Northern Ireland ===
The clearing system in Northern Ireland was operated under the Belfast Clearing Rules which were agreed by the Belfast Bankers' Clearing Company (formerly the Belfast Bankers' Clearing Committee), until the introduction of the Image Clearing System managed by Pay.UK which was completed in August 2019. Sort codes in the 90 range are managed by the Banking and Payments Federation Ireland (former Irish Payment Services Organisation (IPSO)).

Range	Bank	Note
90	Bank of Ireland	
91	Danske Bank	formerly Northern Bank (2012) formerly Belfast Banking Company (1970)
93	Allied Irish Banks (UK)	for AIB (Northern Ireland) formerly First Trust Bank formerly TSB Northern Ireland (1991)
94	Bank of Ireland	
95	Danske Bank	formerly Northern Bank (2012) former Midland Bank subsidiary (1965)
98	Ulster Bank	subsidiary of NatWest (1917)

== Sort codes of Ireland ==
Sort codes are no longer directly used in Ireland, although they still form part of the underlying structure of account numbers. As a part of the Eurozone, all aspects of the SEPA system are fully implemented and adhered to. This means that all domestic transactions, including direct debit and interbank transfers, are processed using an IBAN through the SEPA system. The Irish electronic clearing systems, including those run by the Irish Retail Electronic Payments Clearing Company Ltd, which entered voluntary liquidation in late 2014, have been retired and replaced by SEPA. Domestic cheques continue to be processed by the Irish Paper Clearing Company CLG.

Historically, the Irish banking system shared the sort code structure used in the UK, but operated as a separate system since the Irish pound broke the link with sterling in March 1979. Codes are issued by the Banking and Payments Federation Ireland (BPFI) which replaced IPSO in 2014.

The full list of sort codes used in Ireland is as follows:

Note: A large number of lower volume users and smaller banks share the 99 XX XX code and there are at least three users of the 93 XX XX codes assigned primarily to AIB.

Range	Bank	Note
90	Bank of Ireland	
92	Central Bank of Ireland	
93	AIB Bank	93-09-03 for JP Morgan Bank Ireland plc 93-90-21 for EBS d.a.c.
95	Danske Bank (Ireland)	trading as Danske Bank
98	Ulster Bank Ireland dac	
99-06 to 99-07	Permanent TSB	

99 is used by a large number of financial institutions, particularly those with smaller branch networks or a single branch:

Range	Bank	Note
99-00-51 to 99-00-52	Citibank Europe plc	
99-00-61 to 99-00-62	Bank of America; Realex Financial Services	
99-02-04	Royal Bank of Scotland	
99-02-06	BNP Paribas Ireland	
99-02-12	Barclays Bank Ireland	
99-02-31	HSBC Bank	
99-02-40	ING Bank	
99-02-60	Rabobank International	
99-02-70	KBC Bank Ireland	
99-03-01	An Post	
99-03-20	for Aareal Bank	
99-03-25	for CACEIS Bank	
99-03-60	for Revolut Bank UAB	
99-04	Bank of Scotland	
99-10	BNP Paribas Ireland for Irish Credit Unions	
99-11-99	Fire Financial Services	
99-21 to 99-22	Irish Credit Unions	
99-99-01	Central Bank of Ireland for the Paymaster General of Ireland; Irish Bank Resolution Corporation (IBRC)	

Irish bank account numbers are now presented in the IBAN format as follows:

IE97 BANK 9799 9912 3456 78

This corresponds to the fictitious sort code: 97-99-99 and account: 12345678, prefixed by ISO Country code: IE, IBAN check digits 97 and Bank Identifier: BANK

== Codes in the 70 range – "walks" ==
Numbers starting with a '7' (after the 1960s, '70') were reserved for the large number of London offices of banks which were not members of the London Clearing system. Individual sort codes were allocated on a one-off basis to the many London offices of private and foreign banks. Cheques drawn on these banks were colloquially known within the banking industry as 'walks' because they were cleared by being hand-delivered ("walked") to the drawee banks by messengers from the Clearing House.

By the 1990s, most of these banks had been issued with sort codes within the ranges of the various clearing banks which, from then on, acted as clearing agents for them; the practice of "walking" cheques was ended. For cheques drawn on banks that had not made such an arrangement, the cheques were posted to the drawee bank, who would settle them by a cheque drawn on a clearing bank.

== International clearance ==
Within the Eurozone, only IBAN numbers are required. Transfers to and from the United Kingdom, the United States and Australia and any other countries outside the Eurozone continue to use international networks and require a combination of IBAN (or a domestic account and sorting/routing code) alongside a BIC code to identify the institution sending and receiving payments. Characters 9 to 14 of British and Irish IBANs hold the bank account sort code.

In some countries there is no direct equivalent of sort codes as the bank and branch codes are maintained separately from each other in those countries. Other countries, however, have or had codes which are equivalent to sort codes, but with formats unique to the country concerned. Examples include:

- Germany/Austria: Bankleitzahl (BLZ) – superseded by and incorporated into the IBAN as part of SEPA standardization
- Switzerland: Bankenclearing-Nummer (BC-Nummer)
- Australia: Bank-State-Branch (BSB)
- Canada: Transit Code
- Sweden: Clearingnummer
- Ukraine: MFO
- India: IFSC (Indian Financial System Code)

The codes listed above for Germany, Austria, Switzerland and Sweden are incorporated into the IBANs for those countries.

== See also ==
- List of banks in the United Kingdom
- Business Identifier Code, formerly Bank Identifier Code
- International Bank Account Number
- Industry Sorting Code Directory (UK)
- Bank state branch (Australia)

== Sources ==
- UK Clearings Directory 2005 (p. 297), The Association for Payment Clearing Services
