= Irish Payment Services Organisation =

Irish company limited by guarantee owned by its member banks

The Irish Payment Services Organisation Limited (IPSO) was established in June 1997. IPSO was a company limited by guarantee owned by its member banks.

Its primary objective was to preserve the integrity and security of the bank payment system in Ireland - the systems used for the settlement of physical cheques as well as ATM transfers and debit and credit card purchases.

== History and functions ==
Domestic cheques had been cleared for almost 150 years by the Dublin Bankers' Clearing Committee, sending only cheques drawn on British banks for clearing in London. However, once it became clear that Ireland would join the Euro and that the United Kingdom would not do so, a formal domestic mechanism was needed to promote Irish payments interoperability and assist in the design of payment systems development, both for legacy paper instruments such as cheques and for electronic transfers such as ATM withdrawals, card payments, and internet payments. In particular IPSO was responsible for implementing rapid, and later real-time, Irish payments clearing in the transition period during which Euro area payments were being modernised.

Ireland's clearing entities – including Irish Paper Clearing Co Ltd (IPCC), which cleared paper payment instruments such as cheques, and the Electronic Funds Transfer clearing system operated by the Irish Retail Electronic Clearing Company (IRECC) – operated under the IPSO umbrella. Each company had its own board of directors. Each bank that was a member of one or more clearing entity had a right to membership of IPSO.

IPSO also provided central programme management for key national and banking-industry policy initiatives such as the National Payments Implementation Programme (the Department of Finance's initiative to move Ireland to universal acceptance of electronic payments and migrate from cash and cheques), Ireland's implementation of SEPA (the Single Euro Payments Area, which enables customers to make cashless Euro payments to any bank account located anywhere in the Eurozone), Chip and PIN card adoption, and electronic fraud prevention.

== Controversy over competition ==
In the late 1990s, drawn by the Irish economy's rapid growth, non-domestic banks such as Bank of Scotland, KBC Bank, and National Australia Bank started to enter the Irish banking market through acquisitions as well as organic development. These banks needed access to the clearing organisations to settle payments to and from the bank accounts they opened for Irish customers. Both bankers and the media, most notably the Bank of Scotland, alleged that the IPSO made it difficult for new banks to enter the Irish market by making it slow and expensive to join the clearing organisations. The Irish competition authority, the Competition and Consumer Protection Commission, began an investigation into Ireland's market for retail banking services. This resulted in changes in the structure and governance of IPSO's clearing entities, amendments to banking regulations in Ireland, and voluntary reforms by the existing Irish banks. A parallel and similar complaint was brought against the Belfast Bankers' Clearing Committee, which cleared payments in Northern Ireland. The United Kingdom's Competition Commission found that banks in Northern Ireland must improve their personal current account services, including by lowering bank charges.

== Merger into BPFI ==
IPSO was integrated with the Irish Banking Federation (IBF) in 2014, which became the Banking and Payments Federation Ireland (BPFI).
