= Bank code =

Code assigned by a central bank to other institutions

A bank code is a code assigned by a central bank, a bank supervisory body or a Bankers Association in a country to all its licensed member banks or financial institutions. The rules vary to a great extent between the countries. Also the name of bank codes varies. In some countries the bank codes can be viewed over the internet, but mostly in the local language.

The (national) bank codes differ from the international Bank Identifier Code (BIC/ISO 9362, a normalized code - also known as Business Identifier Code, Bank International Code and SWIFT code). Those countries which use International Bank Account Numbers (IBAN) have mostly integrated the bank code into the prefix of specifying IBAN account numbers. The bank codes also differ from the Bank card code (CSC).

The term "bank code" is sometimes (inappropriately) used by merchants to refer to the Card Security Code printed on the back of a credit card.

== Europe ==
- Belgium has a national system with account numbers of 12 digits. There are no separate bank codes. The first 3 digits of the account number are called the protocol number, and indicate the bank the account belongs to.
- Czech Republic and Slovakia have 4-digit bank codes, used behind account number (domestic account number is XXXXXX-YYYYYYYYYY/CCCC, where CCCC is bank code). A bank branch can be identified from the bank code.
- Denmark has 4-digit bank code (called Registreringsnummer, or Reg. nr.).
- France has a 10 digit code, the first 5 digits contain the clearing identifier of the banking company (Code Banque), followed by the 5-digit branch code (Code Guichet). Both numbers are only used as a combined prefix for the nationwide full account number.
- Germany has an 8-digit routing code. The first 4 digits identify the banking company and the latter 4 digits are assigned to the branch. In the 4-digit bank identifier:
  - the first digit corresponds to one of 8 clearing regions of Germany,
  - the first 3 digits (clearing region identifier and the next 2 digits after it) identify a "banking location" (Bankplatz),
  - the last digit (4th in the whole routing code) denotes a banking company's classification (Bankengruppe).

For bank classification values and identifiers for German clearing regions, see Bankleitzahl (in German).
For a comprehensive list of Germany's "banking location" identifiers, see Bankplätze (in German).

- Greece has a 7-digit Ηellenic Bank Identification Code (HEBIC), where the first 3 digits are the bank code and the last 4 the branch code.
- Hungary starts with the 3 digits of the account number are the bank code issued by the MNB. This is followed by a four-digit branch-office identifier that may be chosen by the credit institution.
- Ireland uses a 6-digit sort code followed by an 8-digit account number similar to and partially integrated with the UK system.

The first two digits of the sort code identify the bank (90-xx-xx = [Bank of Ireland], 98-xx-xx = [Ulster Bank], for example) and the last 4 identify the branch.
There is an exception with 99-xx-xx - these codes are used for international banks Irish Clearing ACs, and some Post Office accounts.

- Italy has a similar clearing system is used with 5 digits identifying the banking company (Codice ABI), followed by a 5-digit CAB (Codice di Avviamento Bancario) identifying the branch, followed by the account number.
- The Netherlands has a national system with account numbers of 9 or 10 digits. There are no separate bank codes. The first 5 digits of the account number can be used to identify the bank (originally also the branch, but clients can now often keep their account number when they move to another branch).
- Spain also has a similar format, with the first 4 digits identifying the banking company, the next 4 identifying the branch, the next 2 being the checksum, followed by the 10-digit account number.
- Sweden has 4 digit bank codes (clearingnummer), with an extra check digit for Swedbank. The first one or two digits are the bank group, and the rest the branch. For a list of Swedish bank codes, see lista över clearingnummer till svenska banker (in Swedish).
- Switzerland has a 3 to 5 digit bank code (Bankenclearing-Nummer); the first digit indicates the bank's classification group. Following after the bank code, a 4-digit number branch code identifier. For a list of Swiss bank codes, see Bank clearing number.
- Ukraine has 6 digit bank codes. Account number does not include bank code. List of bank codes is available at the site of the National Bank of Ukraine.
- The UK has a 6-digit sort code. For prefixes identifying UK banking companies, see the list of sort codes of the United Kingdom.
- Russia has 9 digit bank code (БИК код).

As of February 2014 all countries in the Single Euro Payments Area have switched to an IBAN-based system for clearing (including TARGET2 for cross-border transfers). The national bank codes have been integrated into the IBAN definition, in most cases at the start of the new account number (starting at position 5 after the common prefix of two-letter country identifier and two check digits). This is valid for transfers in the euro currency. Countries which retain their own currency use their own system for transfers in their currency.

== North America ==
- Canada uses codes called routing numbers. They consist of 5 digits identifying the branch and the 3 digits identifying the financial institution.
- United States - The American Bankers Association since 1910 has used a 9-digit routing transit number to identify American banks, which are used in the automated processing of checks. The bank company is identified in the 5th to 8th digits (the 4 digits before the last checksum digit). The company number assigned to a bank includes a regional prefix indicating the metropolitan area and/or state.

== South America ==
- Argentina - Each bank account is identified by the CBU (Clave Bancaria Uniforme). It is a 22-digit code constructed as follows: 3 digits for the bank code, 4 digits for the branch, 1 check digit, and 13 digits for the bank account.
- Venezuela - The Central Bank of Venezuela, since 2001, has used a 20-digit to identify venezuelan banks. The bank company is identified in first four digits followed by four digits for agency, two digits for checksum and last ten digits for bank account.

== Asia-Pacific ==
- Australia has a 6-digit Bank State Branch (BSB) code which precedes the account number. The first 2 or 3 digits indicate the financial institution and the other 3 or 4 digits are the branch codes assigned by the institution.
- In China, the CNAPS code or CNAPS bank code is a code used to uniquely identifies bank accounts for domestic payments in mainland China. The CNAPS code is assigned to all banks in China, including foreign banks. This code is twelve digits long and is mandatory for payments to mainland China.
- India has an 11-digit alpha numeric Indian Financial System Code (IFSC). The first 4 characters indicate the financial institution, the fifth digit is 0 and the other 6 digits indicate the branch. In between space you just enter 0 in it to complete.
- Indonesia It is used for clearing/kliring transactions such as checks, giros, etc. PayPal uses this domestic clearing code to transfer money from the PayPal accounts of Indonesian users to their Indonesian bank accounts in Rupiah. The first three digits of the bank code are also used for inter-bank transfers using an ATM.
- Iraq has a 1 to 3 digit bank code which identifies the bank branch.
- New Zealand has a 6-digit prefix identical to Australia's BSB code, and although they appear similar (e.g. ANZ bank accounts in both countries start with 01, Westpac with 03), they are not compatible. The first 2 digits indicate the bank and the next 4 digits indicate the branch. All digits, along with the seven-digit account number and two or three digit suffix, are required for all wire transfers regardless of whether the transfer is intra-bank or interbank.
- Since 2010, South Korea uses a 7-digit code starting with 0 or 2. The first 3 digits, called the bank code, is required for interbank wire transfers. The last 4 digits are a branch code, which is rarely used.

== See also ==
- Sort code
- ISO 9362 (Bank Identifier Code)
