= Australian Prudential Regulation Authority =

Regulatory body for the Australian financial sector

Statutory authority overview
- Formed: 1 July 1998
- Preceding agencies: Insurance and Superannuation Commission; Reserve Bank of Australia; Australian Financial Institutions Commission
- Dissolved: Australian Prudential Regulation Commission
- Jurisdiction: Commonwealth of Australia
- Headquarters: 1 Martin Place, Sydney, New South Wales
- Employees: 844 (2021–2022)
- Minister responsible: Jim Chalmers MP, Treasurer of Australia
- Statutory authority executives: John Lonsdale, Chair; Margaret Cole, Deputy Chair; Suzanne Smith, Member; Therese McCarthy Hockey, Member
- Key document: Australian Prudential Regulation Authority Act, 1998 (Cth)
- Website: www.apra.gov.au

The Australian Prudential Regulation Authority (APRA) is a statutory authority of the Australian Government and the prudential regulator of the Australian financial services industry. APRA was established on 1 July 1998 in response to the recommendations of the Wallis Inquiry. APRA's authority and scope is determined pursuant to the Australian Prudential Regulation Authority Act, 1998 (Cth).

== Regulatory scope ==
APRA was established on 1 July 1998. It oversees banks, credit unions, building societies, friendly societies, general insurance, health insurance, reinsurance, and life insurance companies, and most members of the superannuation industry. It ensures that these institutions keep their financial promises; that is, that they will remain financially sound and able to meet their obligations to depositors, fund members and policy holders. APRA currently supervises institutions holding A$8.6 trillion in assets for Australian depositors, policyholders and superannuation fund members. APRA is largely funded by levies on the financial institutions that it supervises.

== Executive ==
APRA is governed by an Executive Group, usually consisting of four people. All are statutory appointees. As of 2022, the Chair of APRA is John Lonsdale and the Deputy Chair is Margaret Cole. Suzanne Smith and Therese McCarthy Hockey are additional APRA Members.

#	Chair	Start of term	End of term	Appointer	Time in position
1	Jeffrey Carmichael	1 July 1998	30 June 2003	Peter Costello	5 years
2	John Laker	1 July 2003	30 June 2014	Peter Costello	11 years
3	Wayne Byers	1 July 2014	30 October 2022	Wayne Swan	8 years, 122 days
4	John Lonsdale	31 October 2022	incumbent	Jim Chalmers	3 years, 281 days

== History ==
The Insurance and Superannuation Commission (ISC) was formally established on 23 November 1987, following the proclamation of the Insurance and Superannuation Commissioner Act 1987. It was constructed from the Superannuation Division of Treasury, The Office of the General Insurance Commissioner, The Office of Life Insurance Commissioner, and The Office of the Australian Government Actuary. The commission was based at the Australian Automobile Association Building, Canberra (Note: 212 Northbourne Avenue) and also had offices in Melbourne and Sydney. The Insurance and Superannuation Commission was absorbed into the Australian Prudential Regulation Authority on 1 July 1998.

In June 1996, the Financial System Inquiry (known as the Wallis Inquiry) was established to examine the results of the deregulation of the Australian financial system, to examine the forces driving further change, particularly technological, and recommend changes to the regulatory system to ensure an "efficient, responsive, competitive and flexible financial system to underpin stronger economic performance, consistent with financial stability, prudence, integrity and fairness."

At the time, the regulators of the Australian financial services industry were based on the institutions and not the regulatory function. APRA's predecessor regulators were the Insurance and Superannuation Commission, the Reserve Bank of Australia and the Australian Financial Institutions Commission (AFIC). The Wallis Inquiry recommended a new structure.

The role of the Reserve Bank of Australia (RBA) was amended to deal with monetary policy and systemic stability with the Payments System Board considering payments systems regulation. The role of the Australian Prudential Regulation Commission (later to become APRA) was amended to deal with prudential regulation of authorised deposit-taking institutions (ADIs), life and general insurance, and superannuation including Industry superannuation. The Corporations and Financial Services Commission was renamed and its role expanded as the Australian Securities and Investments Commission (ASIC) to deal with market integrity, consumer protection and corporations.

APRA was established on 1 July 1998 under the Australian Prudential Regulation Authority Act 1998.

APRA became prominent in the collapse of HIH Insurance in 2001 and for its investigation into the National Australia Bank foreign currency deal scandal in 2004.

APRA took over the previous role of the Private Health Insurance Administration Council in July 2015.

In 2018, Peter Harris, the chair of the Productivity Commission, was critical of the role of APRA in limiting price competition in banking. Representatives of APRA appeared before the Royal Commission into Misconduct in the Banking, Superannuation and Financial Services Industry during 2018.

In 2018, APRA created the restricted authorised deposit-taking institution (RADI) licensing framework to encourage new entrants and competition to the existing banking system.

In 2025, APRA has again increased the cash reserve requirement for ANZ Group, raising it to A$1 billion from A$750 million, citing continued failures in managing non-financial risks. APRA said these issues may extend beyond the trading desk and that ANZ’s current risk management improvements are insufficient. ANZ said in a separate statement that it had accepted all recommendations of the review, and was taking immediate actions in response to the review and the undertaking with APRA. Mark Evans, currently head of Singapore, Southeast Asia, India and the Middle East, will take up the new role of group head of non-financial risk program.

== Prudential Standards and Practice Guides ==
APRA establishes prudential standards with which regulated institutions must comply. It also creates and maintains Prudential Practice Guides (PPGs) to provide guidance on APRA's view of "sound practice" in particular areas for specific industries, as well as areas common to most APRA-regulated entities ("cross-industry guides"). PPGs frequently discuss statutory requirements from legislation, regulations or APRA's prudential standards, but do not themselves create enforceable requirements.

Common cross-industry standards and guides
Area	Standard	Practice Guide
110 – Internal Capital Adequacy Assessment Process and Supervisory Review		CPG 110 (March 2013)
220 – Risk Management	CPS 220	CPG 220 (Apr 2018)
226 – Margining and Risk Mitigation for Non-centrally Cleared Derivatives	CPS 226	
231 – Outsourcing	CPS 231	CPG 231 (Oct 2006)
232 – Business Continuity Management	CPS 232	
233 – Pandemic Planning		CPG 233 (May 2013)
234 – Information Security	CPS 234	CPG 234 (Jun 2019)
235 – Managing Data Risk		CPG 235 (Sep 2013)
320 – Actuarial and Related Matters	CPS 320	CPG 320 (Jul 2019)
510 – Governance	CPS 510	
511 – Remuneration	CPS 511	CPG 511 (Oct 2021)
520 – Fit and Proper	CPS 520	

== See also ==
- Four pillars policy
- List of financial supervisory authorities by country
