= Routing transit number =

Code used in U.S. check transactions

In the United States, an ABA routing transit number (ABA RTN) is a nine-digit code printed on the bottom of checks to identify the financial institution on which it was drawn. The American Bankers Association (ABA) developed the system in 1910 to facilitate the sorting, bundling, and delivering of paper checks to the drawer's (check writer's) bank for debit to the drawer's account.

Newer electronic payment methods continue to rely on ABA RTNs to identify the paying bank or other financial institution. Federal Reserve payment services use routing numbers to identify participants in Fedwire Funds Service, Fedwire Securities Service, and FedACH transactions.

== Management ==
Since 1911, the American Bankers Association has partnered with a series of registrars, currently Accuity, to manage the ABA routing number system. Accuity is the Official Routing Number Registrar and is responsible for assigning ABA RTNs and managing the ABA RTN system. Accuity publishes the American Bankers Association Key to Routing Numbers semi-annually. The "Key Book" contains the listing of all ABA RTNs that have been assigned.

There are approximately 26,895 active ABA RTNs currently in use. Every financial institution in the United States has at least one. The Routing Number Policy allows for up to five ABA RTNs to be assigned to a financial institution. Many institutions have more than five ABA RTNs as a result of mergers.

ABA RTNs are only for use in payment transactions within the United States. They are used on paper check, wire transfers, and ACH transactions. On a paper check, the ABA RTN is usually the middle set of nine numbers printed at the bottom of the check. Domestic transfers that use the ABA RTN will usually be returned to the paying bank. The same bank may use different routing numbers for checks vs. wire transfers.

Incoming international wire transfers also use a BIC code, also known as a SWIFT code, as they are administered by the Society for Worldwide Interbank Financial Telecommunication (SWIFT) and defined by ISO 9362. In addition, many international financial institutions use an IBAN code.

The IBAN was originally developed to facilitate payments within the European Union but the format is flexible enough to be applied globally. It consists of an ISO 3166-1 alpha-2 country code, followed by two check digits that are calculated using a mod-97 technique, and Basic Bank Account Number (BBAN) with up to thirty alphanumeric characters. The BBAN includes the domestic bank account number and potentially routing information. The national banking communities decide individually on a fixed length for all BBAN in their country.

== History ==
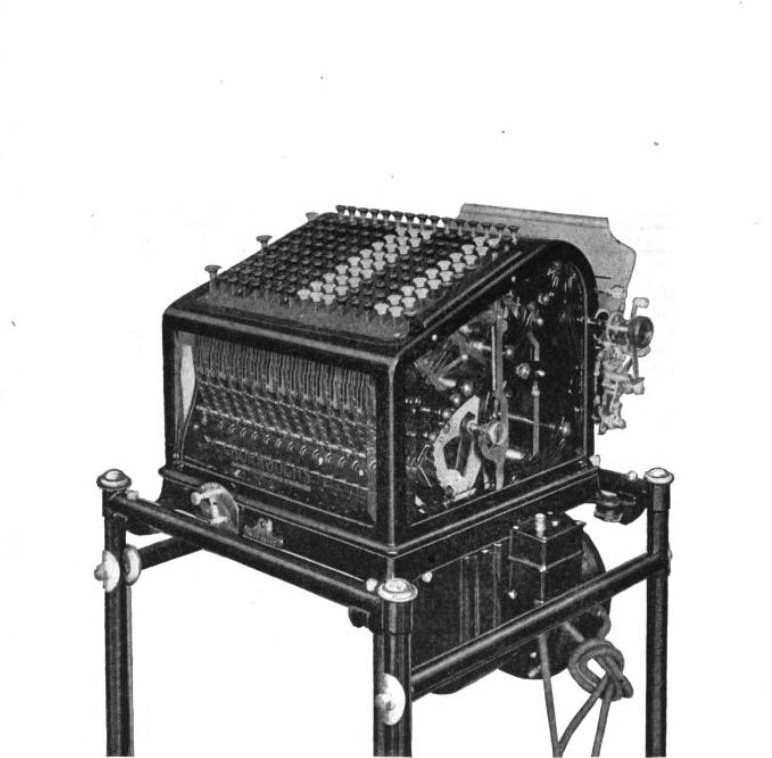
In 1911 the new Burroughs Transit Machine, made by the Burroughs Adding Machine Company, was advertised in the first edition of the bank directory Key to Numerical System of the American Bankers' Association.

The bank numbers in the United States were originated by the American Bankers Association (ABA) in 1911. Banks had been disagreeing on identification. The ABA arranged a meeting of clearing house managers in Chicago in December 1910. The gathering chose a committee to assign each bank in the country convenient numbers to use. In May 1911, the American Bankers Association released the codes. The numerical committee was W. G. Schroeder, C. R. McKay, and J. A. Walker. The publisher of the new directory was Rand-McNally and Company. The ABA clearing house codes are like the sub-headings in a decimal outline. The prefixes mean locations and the suffixes banking firms within those locations. Half of the prefixes represent major cities the other half represent regions of the United States. Lower prefixes are used for higher populations, first based on the 1910 U. S. Census. Likewise, within each prefix area banks are numbered in order of city population and bank seniority, although single-bank towns are numbered in alphabetical order. When a new bank is being organized, the current publisher of the directory of banks assigns it a transit code. The American Bankers Association asked banks to use the directory exclusively so banks would agree on how to sort checks. The book was abbreviated Key to Numerical System of The American Bankers Association, and as the Key. It was published by Rand McNally & Co. In 1952 Rand McNally moved its corporate headquarters to Skokie, Illinois, and became more interested in publishing maps. Also in Skokie is a company called Accuity, which from its history has been the official registrar of ABA bank numbers since 1911. By 2014 it was the publisher of the semi-annual ABA Key to Routing Numbers and was owned by Reed Business Information, British publisher of reference works for professionals, which in turn is owned by Reed-Elsevier, English-Dutch publisher of online format reference works for professionals. Over the years the ABA's identification numbers for banks accommodated the Federal Reserve Act, the Expedited Funds Act and the Check 21 Act. By 2014 the Key included the U. S. Federal Reserve's nine-digit magnetic-ink routing numbers.

== Formats ==
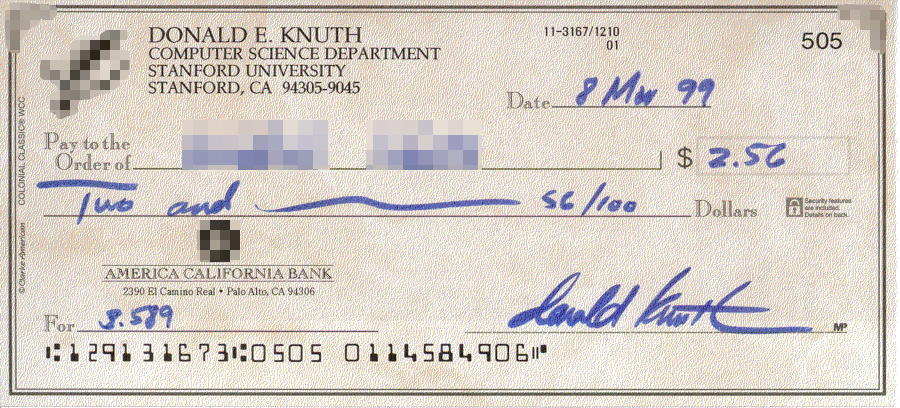
A check showing the fraction form (top middle-right, 11-3167/1210 plus branch number 01) and MICR form (bottom left, 129131673) of the transit number.

The ABA RTN appears in two forms on a standard check – the fraction form and the MICR (magnetic ink character recognition) form. Both forms give essentially the same information, though there are slight differences.

The MICR forms are the main form – it is printed in magnetic ink, and is machine-readable; it appears at the bottom left of a check, and consists of nine digits.

The fraction form was used for manual processing before the invention of the MICR line, and still serves as a backup in check processing should the MICR line become illegible or torn; it generally appears in the upper right part of a check near the date.

The MICR number is of the form

XXXXYYYYC

where XXXX is Federal Reserve Routing Symbol, YYYY is ABA Institution Identifier, and C is the Check Digit, while the fraction is of the form:

PP-YYYY/XXXX

where PP is a 1 or 2 digit Prefix, no longer used in processing, but still printed, representing the bank's check processing center location, with 1 through 49 for processing centers located in a major city, and 50 through 99 representing processing is done at a non-major city in a particular state. Sometimes a branch number or the account number are printed below the fraction form; branch number is not used in processing, while the account number is listed in MICR form at the bottom. Further, the Federal Reserve Routing Symbol and ABA Institution Identifier may have fewer than 4 digits in the fraction form. The essential data, shared by both forms, is the Federal Reserve Routing Symbol (XXXX), and the ABA Institution Identifier (YYYY), and these are usually the same in both the fraction form and the MICR, with only the order and format switched (and left-padded with 0s to ensure that they are 4 digits long).

The prefix and the Federal Reserve Routing Symbol (XXXX) are determined by the bank's geographical location and treatment by the Federal Reserve type, while the remaining data (YYYY, and Branch number, if present) depends on the specific bank, and are unique within a Federal Reserve district.

In the check depicted above right, the fraction form is 11-3167/1210 (with 01 below it) and MICR form is 129131673 which are analyzed as follows:

- the prefix 11 corresponds to San Francisco,
- 3167 (common to both) is the ABA Institution Identifier,
- 1210 and 1291 are the Federal Reserve Routing Symbols (generally equal, here different probably due to obfuscation, see image file history for more information), with the initial "12" corresponding to the Federal Reserve Bank of San Francisco, the third digits ("1" and "9") corresponding to check processing centers, and the fourth digits ("0" and "1") corresponding to where the bank is located – "0" indicates "in the Federal Reserve city of San Francisco", while "1" indicates "in the state of California".
- the final "3" in the MICR is the check digit, and
- the "01" below the fraction form is the branch number.

In the case of a MICR line that is illegible or torn, the check can still be processed without the check digit. Typically, a repair strip or sleeve is attached to the check, then a new MICR line is imprinted. Either 021200025 or 0212-0002 (with a hyphen, but no check digit) may be printed, and both are 9 digits. The former (with check digit) is preferred to ensure better accuracy, but requires computing the check digit, while the latter is easily determined by inspection of the fraction, with minimal clerical handling.

=== MICR routing number format ===
The MICR routing number consists of nine digits:

XXXXYYYYC

where XXXX is Federal Reserve Routing Symbol, YYYY is ABA Institution Identifier, and C is the check digit.

==== Federal Reserve ====
The Federal Reserve uses the ABA RTN system for processing its customers' payments. The ABA RTNs were originally assigned in the systematic way outlined below, reflecting a financial institution's geographical location and internal handling by the Federal Reserve. Following consolidation of the Federal Reserve's check processing facilities, and the consolidation in the banking industry, the RTN a financial institution uses may not reflect the "Fed District" where the financial institution's place of business is located. Check processing is now centralized at the Federal Reserve Bank of Atlanta.

The first two digits of the nine digit RTN must be in the ranges 00 through 12, 21 through 32, 61 through 72, or 80.

The digits are assigned as follows:

- 00 is used by the United States Government
- 01 through 12 are the "normal" routing numbers, and correspond to the 12 Federal Reserve Banks. For example, 0260-0959-3 is the routing number for Bank of America incoming wires in New York, with the initial "02" indicating the Federal Reserve Bank of New York.
- 21 through 32 were assigned only to thrift institutions (e.g. credit unions and savings banks) through 1985, but are no longer assigned (thrifts are assigned normal 01–12 numbers). Currently they are still used by the thrift institutions, or their successors, and correspond to the normal routing number, plus 20. (For example, 2260-7352-3 is the routing number for Grand Adirondack Federal Credit Union in New York, with the initial "22" corresponding to "02" (New York Fed) plus "20" (thrift).)
- 61 through 72 are special purpose routing numbers designated for use by non-bank payment processors and clearinghouses and are termed Electronic Transaction Identifiers (ETIs), and correspond to the normal routing number, plus 60.
- 80 is used for traveler's checks

The first two digits correspond to the 12 Federal Reserve Banks as follows:

Primary (01–12)	Thrift (+20)	Electronic (+60)	Federal Reserve Bank
01	21	61	Boston
02	22	62	New York
03	23	63	Philadelphia
04	24	64	Cleveland
05	25	65	Richmond
06	26	66	Atlanta
07	27	67	Chicago
08	28	68	St. Louis
09	29	69	Minneapolis
10	30	70	Kansas City
11	31	71	Dallas
12	32	72	San Francisco

The third digit corresponds to the Federal Reserve check processing center originally assigned to the bank.

The fourth digit is "0" if the bank is located in the Federal Reserve city proper, and otherwise is 1–9, according to which state in the Federal Reserve district it is.

==== ABA Institution Identifier ====
The fifth through eighth digits constitute the bank's unique ABA identity within the given Federal Reserve district.

==== Check digit ====
The ninth, check digit provides a checksum test using a position-weighted sum of each of the digits. High-speed check-sorting equipment will typically verify the checksum and if it fails, route the item to a reject pocket for manual examination, repair, and re-sorting. Mis-routings to an incorrect bank are thus greatly reduced.

The following condition must hold:

(3(d_{1} + d_{4} + d_{7}) + 7(d_{2} + d_{5} + d_{8}) + (d_{3} + d_{6} + d_{9})) mod 10 = 0

(Mod or modulo is the remainder of a division operation.)

In terms of weights, this is 371 371 371. This allows one to catch any single-digit error (incorrectly inputting one digit), together with most transposition errors. 1, 3, and 7 are used because they (together with 9) are coprime to 10; using a coefficient that is divisible by 2 or 5 would lose information (because $5 \cdot 0 = 5 \cdot 2 = 5 \cdot 4 = 5 \cdot 6 = 5 \cdot 8 = 0 \mod 10$), and thus would not catch some substitution errors. These do not catch transpositions of two digits that differ by 5 (0 and 5, 1 and 6, 2 and 7, 3 and 8, 4 and 9), but captures other transposition errors.

As an example, consider 111000025 (which is a valid routing number of Bank of America in Virginia). Applying the formula, we get:

(3(1 + 0 + 0) + 7(1 + 0 + 2) + (1 + 0 + 5)) mod 10 = 0.

==== Routing symbol ====

The symbol that delimits a routing transit number is the MICR E-13B transit character ⑆ This character, with Unicode value U+2446, appears at right.

=== Fraction format ===
The fraction form looks like a fraction, with a numerator and a denominator.

The numerator consists of two parts separated by a dash. The prefix (no longer used in check processing, yet still printed on most checks) is a 1 or 2 digit code (P or PP) indicating the region where the bank is located. The numbers 1 to 49 are cities, assigned by size of the cities in 1910. The numbers 50 to 99 are states, assigned in a rough spatial geographic order, and are used for banks located outside one of the 49 numbered cities.

The second part of the numerator (after the dash) is the bank's ABA Institution Identifier, which also forms digits 5 to 8 of the nine digit routing number (YYYY).

The denominator is also part of the routing number; by adding leading zeroes to make up four digits where necessary (e.g. 212 is written as 0212, 31 is written as 0031, etc.), it forms the first four digits of the routing number (XXXX).

There might also be a fourth element printed to the right of the fraction: this is the bank's branch number. It is not included in the MICR line. It would only be used internally by the bank, e.g. to show where the signature card is located, where to contact the responsible officer in case of an overdraft, etc.

For example, a check from Wachovia Bank in Yardley, PA, has a fraction of 55-2/212 and a routing number of 021200025. The prefix (55) no longer has any relevance, but from the remainder of the fraction, the first 8 digits of the routing number (02120002) can be determined, and the check digit (the last digit, 5 in this example) can be calculated by using the check digit formula (thus giving 021200025).

==== ABA prefix table ====
This table is up to date as of 2020. One weakness of the current routing table arrangement is that various territories like American Samoa, Guam, Puerto Rico and the US Virgin Islands share the same routing code.

Prefix	Location
1	New York, NY
2	Chicago, IL
3	Philadelphia, PA
4	St. Louis, MO
5	Boston, MA
6	Cleveland, OH
7	Baltimore, MD
8	Pittsburgh, PA
9	Detroit, MI
10	Buffalo, NY
11	San Francisco, CA
12	Milwaukee, WI
13	Cincinnati, OH
14	New Orleans, LA
15	Washington D.C.
16	Los Angeles, CA
17	Minneapolis, MN
18	Kansas City, MO
19	Seattle, WA
20	Indianapolis, IN
21	Louisville, KY
22	St. Paul, MN
23	Denver, CO
24	Portland, OR
25	Columbus, OH
26	Memphis, TN
27	Omaha, NE
28	Spokane, WA
29	Albany, NY
30	San Antonio, TX
31	Salt Lake City, UT
32	Dallas, TX
33	Des Moines, IA
34	Tacoma, WA
35	Houston, TX
36	St. Joseph, MO
37	Fort Worth, TX
38	Savannah, GA
39	Oklahoma City, OK
40	Wichita, KS
41	Sioux City, IA
42	Pueblo, CO
43	Lincoln, NE
44	Topeka, KS
45	Dubuque, IA
46	Galveston, TX
47	Cedar Rapids, IA
48	Waco, TX
49	Muskogee, OK
50	New York
51	Connecticut
52	Maine
53	Massachusetts
54	New Hampshire
55	New Jersey
56	Ohio
57	Rhode Island
58	Vermont
59	Hawaii
60	Pennsylvania
61	Alabama
62	Delaware
63	Florida
64	Georgia
65	Maryland
66	North Carolina
67	South Carolina
68	Virginia
69	West Virginia
70	Illinois
71	Indiana
72	Iowa
73	Kentucky
74	Michigan
75	Minnesota
76	Nebraska
77	North Dakota
78	South Dakota
79	Wisconsin
80	Missouri
81	Arkansas
82	Colorado
83	Kansas
84	Louisiana
85	Mississippi
86	Oklahoma
87	Tennessee
88	Texas
89	Alaska
90	California
91	Arizona
92	Idaho
93	Montana
94	Nevada
95	New Mexico
96	Oregon
97	Utah
98	Washington
99	Wyoming
101	American Samoa, Guam, Puerto Rico, Virgin Islands

== See also ==
General category

- Bank card number – Used as Bank Identification Number
- Bank code discusses formats used by other countries and regions.
- Bank State Branch, or BSB code used for Australian banks
- International Bank Account Number
- ISO 9362, the SWIFT/BIC code standard
- Magnetic ink character recognition – How RTN's are printed
- Sort code, used by British banks

Canada has similar but different transaction routing structures

- Interac
- Large Value Transfer System (Canada)
- Routing number (Canada)
