= Banking in New Zealand =

The Banking sector in New Zealand dates back to the early days of European settlement in the country. Over the years, the banking industry has played a vital role in supporting economic growth and development, providing financial services to individuals, businesses, and the government. This article explores the significant milestones and transformations in the history of the New Zealand banking sector.

== Early banking in ==
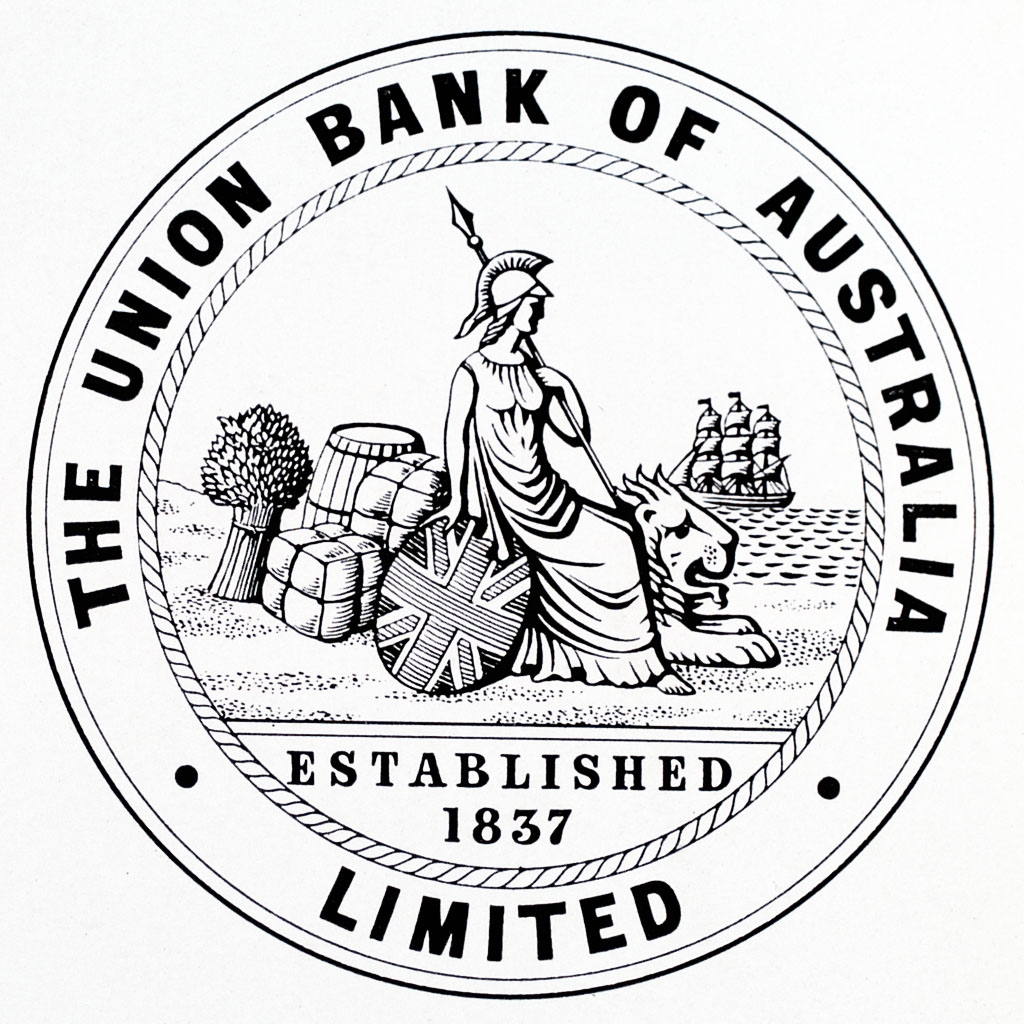
seal of the Union Bank of Australia

New Zealand Banking Company Act 1841

The first bank to operate in New Zealand was the Union Bank of Australia, which opened its branch in Auckland in 1840. The bank primarily served the needs of early European settlers and facilitated trade and commerce in the region. The first bank established in New Zealand was the New Zealand Banking Company that was established in 1840 in the Bay of Islands.

The Bank of New South Wales (now Westpac) followed Union Bank of Australia and establishing its presence in Auckland in 1841.

The Bank of New Zealand (BNZ) was established in 1861 and became the government's banker. The BNZ played a crucial role in supporting economic activities such as infrastructure development and agricultural growth.

The Bank of Otago was founded in 1863 and in 1873 was incorporated into the National Bank of New Zealand.

== Maori Banking ==
The Maungatautari Peeke was one of several banks set up by Māori in the decades after the New Zealand Wars to handle money received from land sales. The Kīngitanga (King Movement) operated at least two – the other was the Bank of Aotearoa.

In 2018 the Māori Council called for the establishment of a Māori-owned bank.

== Trustee Savings Banks ==
The five original banks were established under the Savings Bank Act 1858, and were:

- the Auckland Savings Bank (est. 1847)
- the New Plymouth Savings Bank (est. 1850)
- the Dunedin Savings Bank (est. 1864), which was renamed as The Otago Savings Bank in 1964.
- the Invercargill Savings Bank (est. 1864)
- the Hokitika Savings Bank (est. 1866)

After the Second World War there was a huge increase in the number of regional trustee savings banks, with the following new banks opening:

- the Waikato Savings Bank (est. 1958)
- the Canterbury Savings Bank (est. 1962)
- the Hawke's Bay Savings Bank (est. 1962)
- the Manawatu Wairarapa Savings Bank (est. 1963)
- the Bay of Plenty Savings Bank (est. 1964)
- the South Canterbury Savings Bank (est. 1964)
- the Wellington Savings Bank (est. 1964)
- the Wanganui Savings Bank (est. 19??)

From the 1960s there was a period of consolidation with several of the trust banks merging.

Eastern & Central Savings Bank was a savings bank that operated in New Zealand between 1972 and 1987. It was the result of a merger between two smaller regional savings banks; Hawke’s Bay and Gisborne Savings Bank and Manawatu Wairarapa Savings Bank. Fifteen years later it absorbed the customers of Trust Bank Wanganui to become Trust Bank Central.

Trust Bank New Zealand Ltd was a registered bank that operated in New Zealand between 1986 and 1996. It was made up of (most of) the former regional savings banks that had their origins as far back as 1847.

Trust Bank was acquired by Westpac in 1996, who phased out the Trust Bank brand at the end of 2002, when the bank was rebranded from WestpacTrust to simply Westpac.

== Creation of the Reserve Bank of New Zealand ==
The coat of arms of the Reserve Bank of New Zealand

In 1934, the Reserve Bank of New Zealand was established as the country's central bank. Its primary objective was to regulate monetary policy, maintain price stability, and promote the stability and efficiency of the financial system. The Reserve Bank was granted the authority to issue and regulate currency, supervise banks, and manage foreign exchange reserves.

== Banking and the NZ Government ==
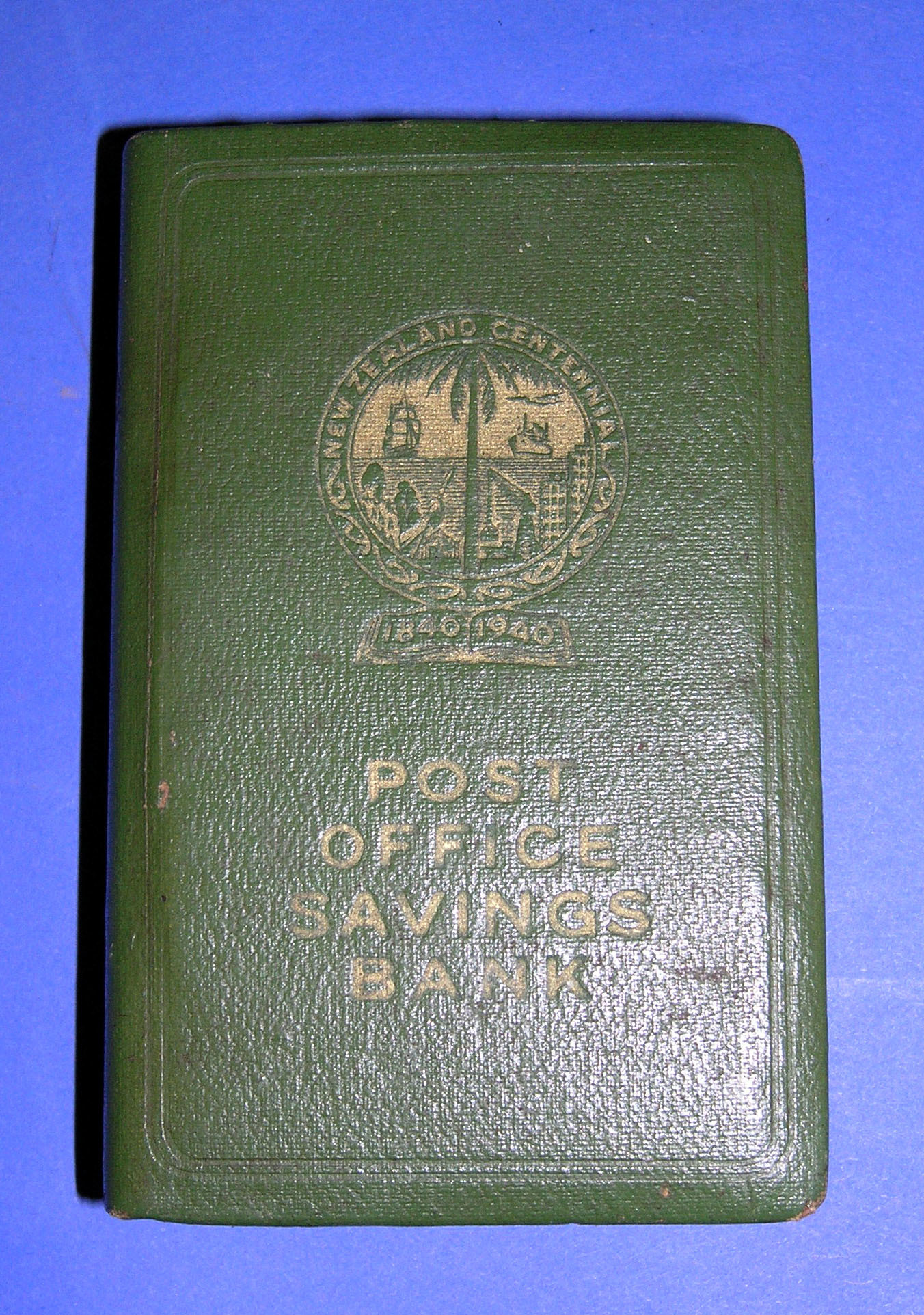
Post Office Savings Bank moneybox 1940

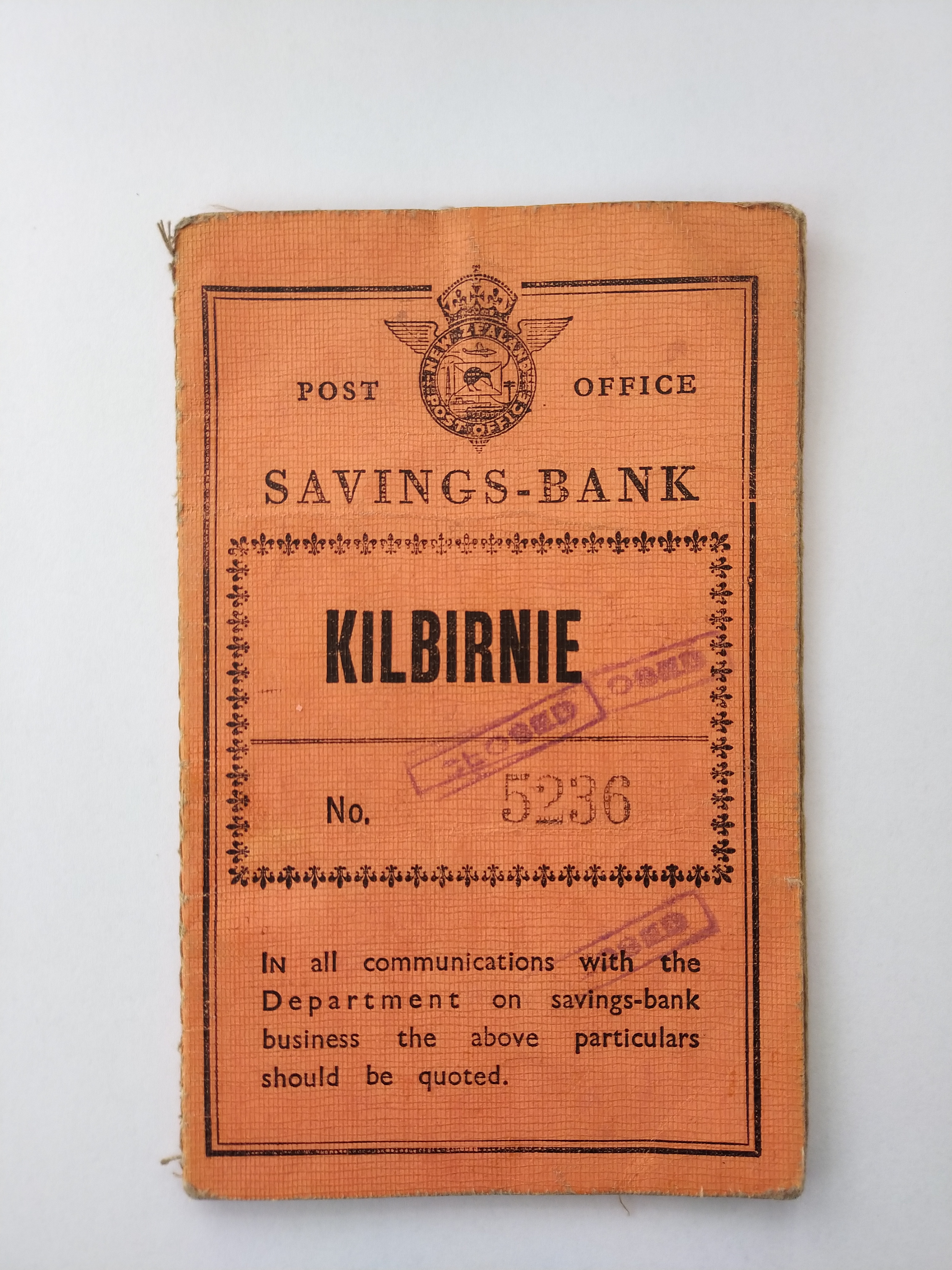
Passbook issued by the New Zealand Post Office Savings Bank in 1953

Post Office Savings Bank, or very briefly PostBank (trading name of Post Office Bank Limited), was a bank owned by the New Zealand Government as the government's postal savings system. The bank was established in 1867. It became PostBank in 1987 and was disestablished and the branches were rebranded when it was acquired by Australia and New Zealand Banking Group (ANZ) in 1989.

In 1974 the NZ Government set up the Rural Bank. The bank was sold to Flecher Challenge Ltd in 1989 and sold again in 1992 to National Bank

The Development Finance Corporation (DFC) of New Zealand was a state-owned investment bank that operated from 1964 to 1991.

In 2002 the Labour government founded Kiwibank as a subsidiary of NZ Post, following a proposal by Deputy Prime Minister Jim Anderton. In 2016 47 percent of Kiwibank was sold to the New Zealand Superannuation Fund (25 percent) and the Accident Compensation Corporation (ACC) (22 percent). Subsequently, in 2022 the NZ Labour government acquired full control of Kiwibank.

In 2026 NZ First leader Winston Peters said that his party would campaign during the 2026 New Zealand general election on nationalising the Bank of New Zealand and merging it with Kiwibank to form a proposed Crown-owned "National Bank of New Zealand.".

== Deregulation and liberalization ==
During the late 20th century, New Zealand underwent significant economic reforms, including the deregulation and liberalization of the banking sector. These reforms aimed to enhance competition, increase efficiency, and improve the overall financial system.

In 1986, the New Zealand government removed exchange controls, allowing greater flexibility in foreign exchange transactions. The banking sector experienced an influx of foreign banks, leading to increased competition and a broader range of services for customers.

One such example was Countrywide Bank (New Zealand), a subsidiary of bank of Scotland founded in 1987. The bank was subsequently bought by National Bank in 1998.

HSBC was the first overseas bank branch to gain registration in New Zealand in 1987. In 2023 HSBC ended their retail banking operations in NZ.

In July, 1987 Citibank (New Zealand Branch) (CBNA NZ) was granted a full banking licence and was designated as a registered bank.

== Australian Parents ==
By 2024 New Zealand, the banking sector was dominated by four large Australian-owned banks, which are responsible for 85% of bank lending. These banks and their parent companies are:

- ANZ Bank New Zealand was formed in 1979 when ANZ (bank) incorporated its branches in New Zealand. In 1989 ANZ acquired PostBank.
- ASB Bank sold 75% of its shares to Commonwealth Bank in 1989, with the remaining 25% being sold to CBA in 2000.
- Bank of New Zealand was acquired in 2003 by the National Australia Bank.
- Westpac New Zealand became part of the Westpac Banking Corporation in 1998 when WBC acquired Trust Bank (New Zealand) forming WestpacTrust. The bank was rebranded as Westpac New Zealand Ltd in 2002.

== Consolidation and mergers ==
The 1990s witnessed a wave of consolidation and mergers in the New Zealand banking sector. Several smaller banks merged with larger ones, resulting in a more concentrated banking industry. The BNZ merged with the National Bank of New Zealand in 1992, forming the National Bank of New Zealand Limited.

In 1996, ANZ Banking Group acquired the National Bank, further consolidating its position as one of the largest banks in New Zealand. Other mergers followed suit, such as the merger of Trust Bank with Westpac in 1996 and the merger of Bank of New Zealand with National Australia Bank in 1998.

== The Small Banks ==
Originally founded in 1928 as the Public Service Investment Society, the Co-operative Bank was registered as a bank in 2011.

The Southland Building, Land and Investment Society was created in 1869. It was registered as the SBS Bank in 2008.

The Heartland Bank was registered in 2012, following the merger of CBS Canterbury (Canterbury Building Society), Southern Cross, MARAC and PGG Wrightson Finance.

== Technological advancements and digital banking ==
An early example of the use of IT in NZ banking was Databank Systems, set up in 1967 as a shared service used by a consortium of New Zealand banks. The company was sold to Electronic Data Systems in 1994.

The 21st century brought significant technological advancements to the banking sector. New Zealand banks embraced digital banking services, allowing customers to access their accounts, make transactions, and manage finances through online platforms and mobile applications. These digital innovations have provided greater convenience and accessibility for customers.

Furthermore, the emergence of financial technology (fintech) companies has disrupted traditional banking models, offering innovative and streamlined financial services. Fintech startups in New Zealand have introduced services such as peer-to-peer lending, digital wallets, and blockchain-based solutions, challenging established banks to adapt and innovate.

=== Open Banking ===
Open Banking allows customers to securely share their banking data and initiate payments through accredited third parties using standardised APIs. New Zealand's Open Banking ecosystem combines industry-led standards and government regulation. From 2024, Payments NZ's API Centre coordinated industry implementation through its Minimum Open Banking Implementation Plan, working with banks, FinTechs, and other stakeholders to standardise APIs. Open Banking is now regulated under the Customer and Product Data Act 2025, which establishes New Zealand's Consumer Data Right framework.

== Banking Ombudsman Service ==
The Banking Ombudsman Scheme in New Zealand was established by the New Zealand Bankers' Association in 1992. Under the Financial Service Providers (Registration and Dispute Resolution) Act 2008, financial service providers became required to be part of an approved dispute resolution scheme.

In its first 25 years, the Scheme assisted over 78,000 consumers and facilitated nearly $39 million in compensation.

== See also ==
- Economy of New Zealand
- List of banks in New Zealand
- Banking in Australia
- Banking Code
- Reserve Bank of New Zealand
- Rogernomics – Economic policy in 1980s New Zealand
- Ruthanasia – New Zealand free-market policies 1990–93
