= Cityscape (sculpture) =

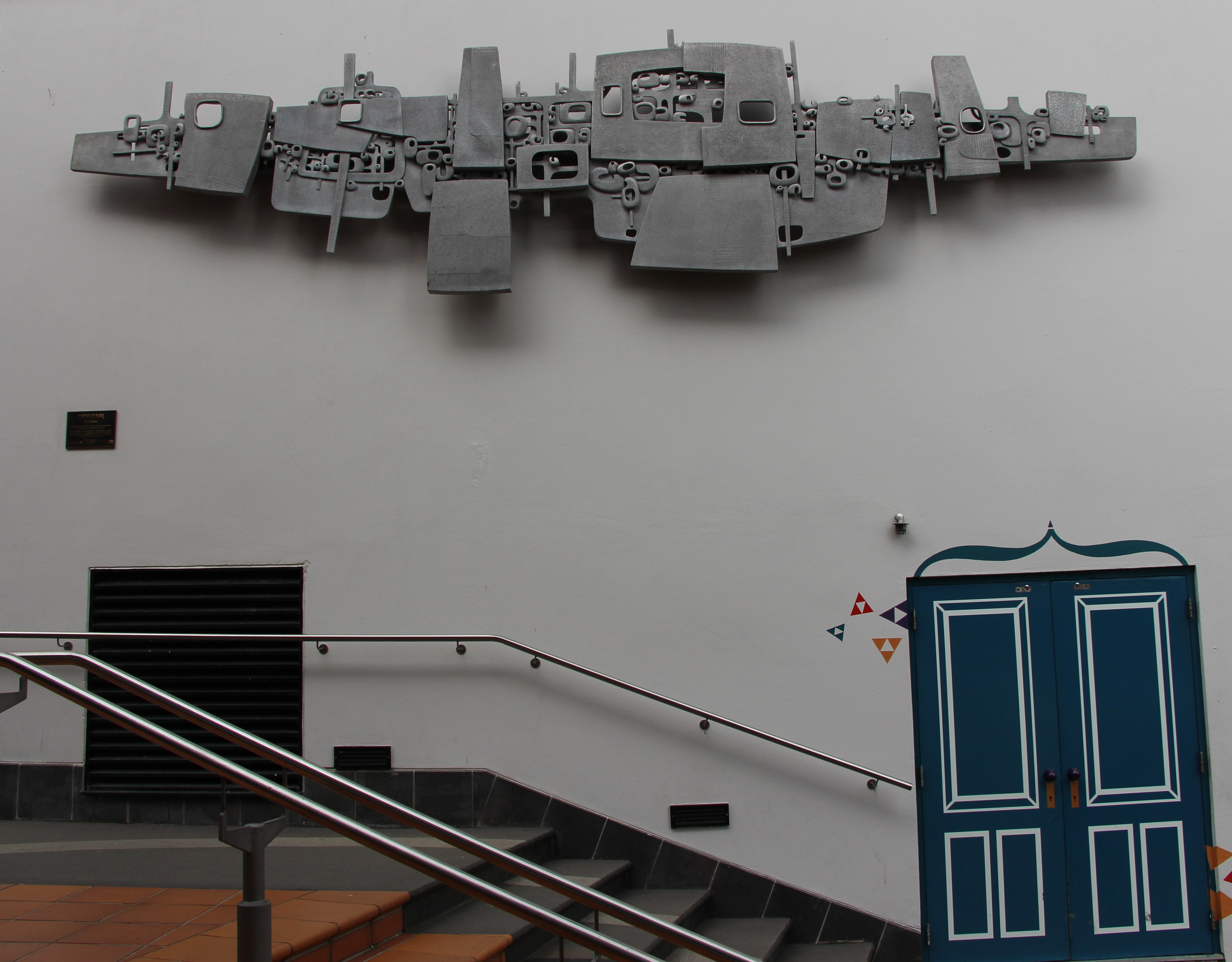
- "Cityscape" on the outside of the Palmerston North City Library.
- Interactive map of Cityscape
- Location: Palmerston North, New Zealand
- Coordinates: 40°21′22″S 175°36′32″E
- Designer: Guy Ngan
- Material: Aluminium
- Opening date: 1980

Cityscape is an aluminium sculpture by Guy Ngan, which hangs on the outside of the Palmerston North City Library in Palmerston North, New Zealand.

The sculpture was originally made for the Eastern & Central Savings Bank branch on Broadway. When the building was sold, it was put into storage. In 2008 it was donated to Palmerston North City and installed on an outside wall of the city's library. It was unveiled to the public on 20 April 2008.
