= Kiwibank =

Retail bank in New Zealand

- Type: Public bank
- Founded: May 2001
- Headquarters: Auckland, New Zealand
- Key people: Steve Jurkovich (chief executive); Jon Hartley (chair of board of directors)
- Products: Banking and financial services
- Operating income: ▲NZ$938 million (2026)
- Net income: ▼NZ$174 million (2026)
- Total assets: ▲NZ$44.878 billion (2026)
- Total equity: ▲NZ$3.271 billion (2026)
- Owner: New Zealand Government; Kiwi Group Capital Limited
- Number of employees: 2500+
- Capital ratio: Tier 1 13.7% (2026)
- Rating: AA (Fitch, Negative outlook), A1 (Moody's, Stable outlook)
- Website: www.kiwibank.co.nz

Kiwibank Limited is a New Zealand wholly state-owned bank and financial services provider. As of 2023, Kiwibank is the fifth-largest bank in New Zealand by assets, and the largest New Zealand-owned bank, with a market share of approximately 9%. In 2026, the bank's assets totalled approximately $45 billion.

Kiwibank was established in 2001 by the Fifth Labour Government of New Zealand, following a proposal by Deputy Prime Minister Jim Anderton to set up a locally owned bank capable of competing with the Big Four Australian banks that dominated the domestic market. It initially operated as a subsidiary of New Zealand Post, with branches co-located within PostShops (post offices) to ensure nationwide accessibility.

== History ==
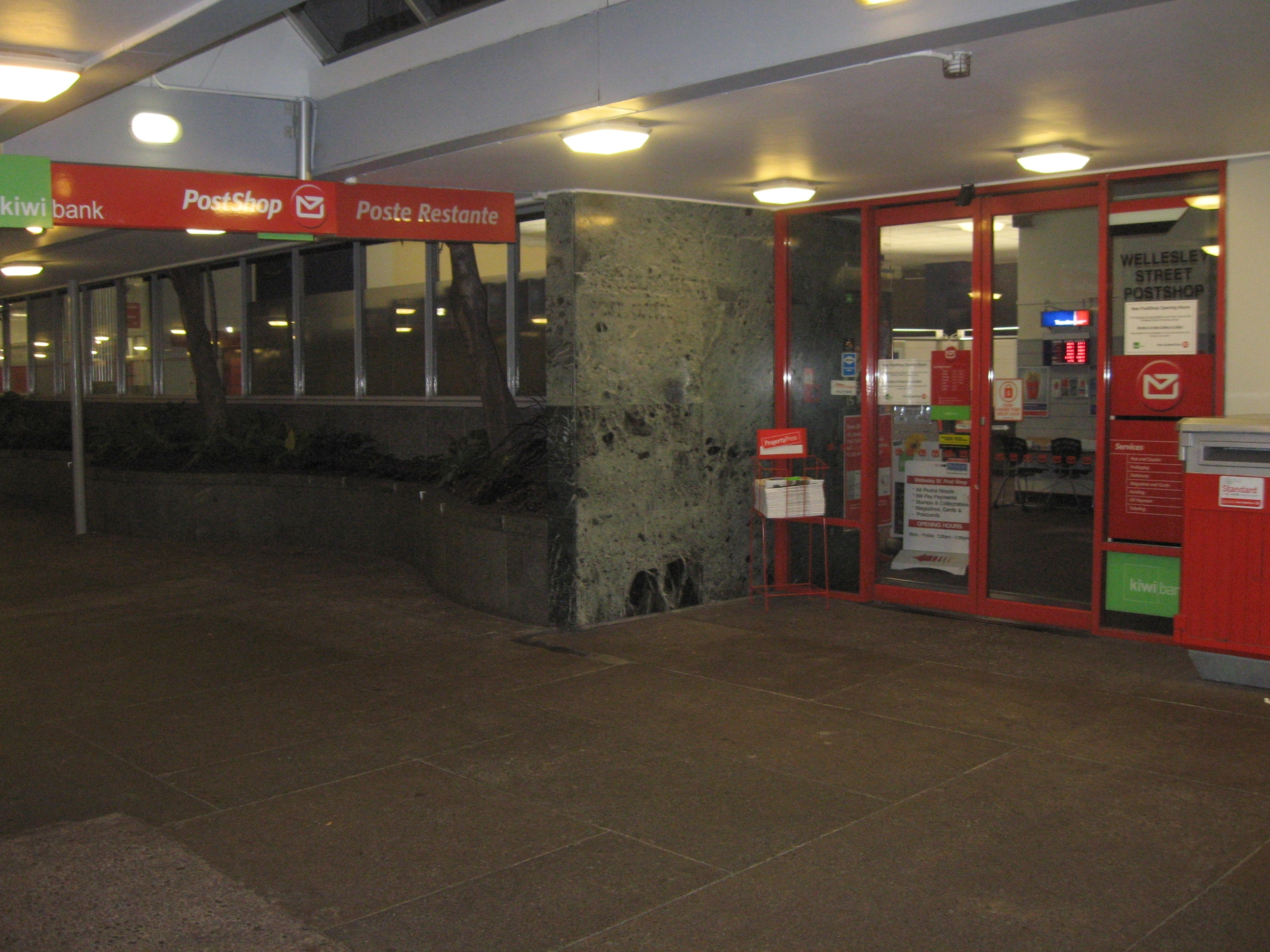
A PostShop in Wellesley Street, Auckland, New Zealand, also serves as a branch of Kiwibank.

=== Earlier state-owned banks ===
Kiwibank is similar in some respects to an earlier post office-based bank owned by the New Zealand Government. The New Zealand Post Office Bank was established in 1867. In 1987, the bank was corporatised and separated from New Zealand Post and Telecom New Zealand to form a stand-alone company – PostBank. Then in 1989 PostBank was sold by the government to ANZ.

=== Establishment period (2002–2010) ===
Jim Anderton revealed in his valedictory speech that after the issue had previously been discussed by cabinet for months, he had spent three hours trying to convince then Finance Minister Michael Cullen, Annette King told Cullen: "Michael, Jim's beaten back every argument against the bank we've ever put up. Give him the bloody bank." Cullen replied: "Oh, all right then."

In 2008, one analysis suggested that Kiwibank had contributed to increased competition in the New Zealand banking sector through lower fees. Additionally, by 2007, Kiwibank had achieved higher customer satisfaction ratings compared to the four major Australian-owned banks operating in New Zealand. In 2008 Kiwibank unveiled an advertising campaign, "Join The Movement", which portrayed foreign-owned competitors as enemy occupiers. The New Zealand Herald called the campaign "jingoistic".

=== Since 2010 ===
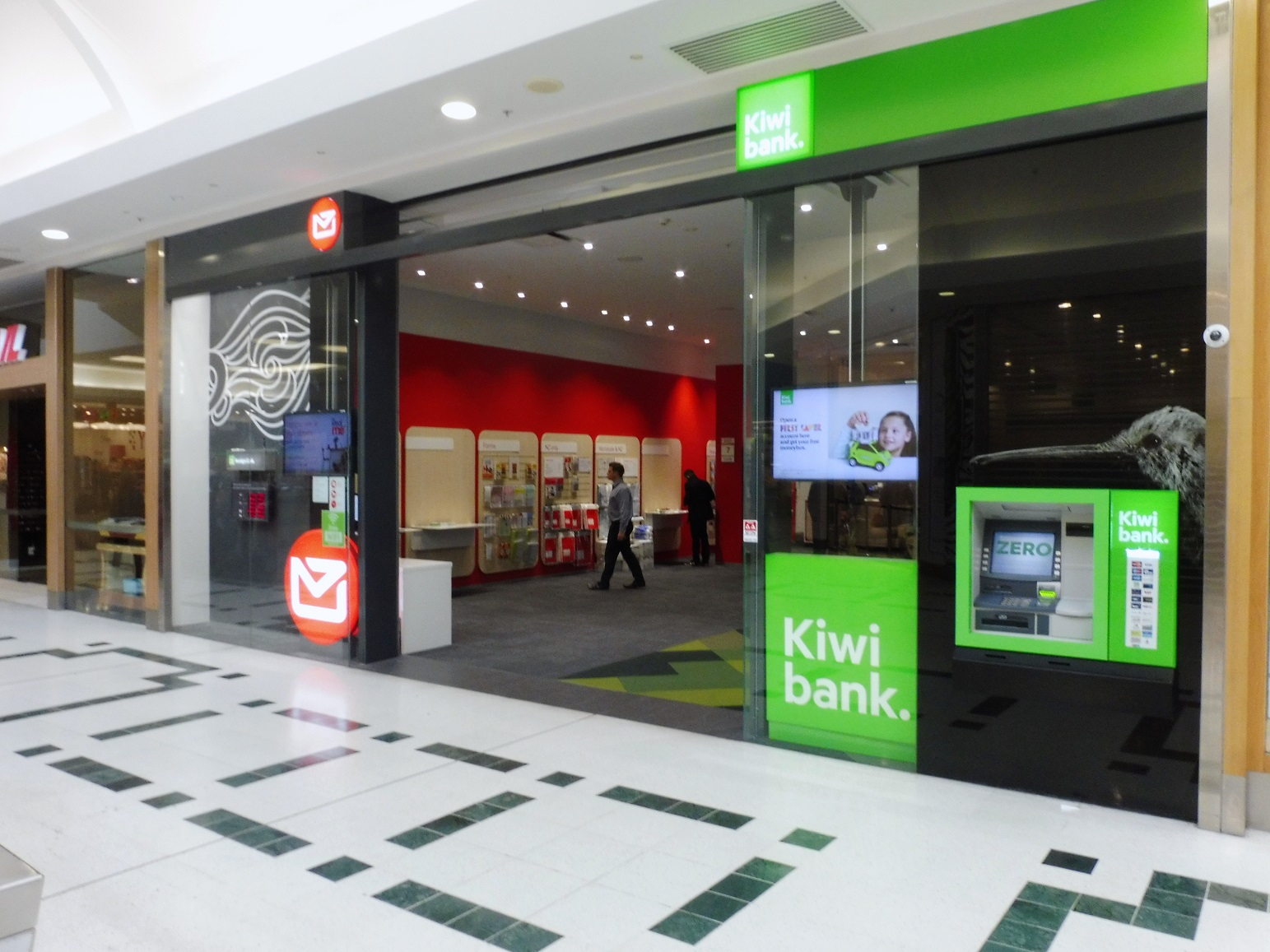
New Zealand Post and Kiwibank shop at The Palms shopping centre in Shirley, Christchurch

Kiwibank announced an after tax profit of $21.2 million for the year ended 30 June 2011.

In 2012, Kiwibank celebrated its ten-year birthday. The advertising campaign used 10-year-old Kiwis pledging what they're standing up for with New Zealand musician Neil Finn agreeing to the use of his song "Can You Hear Us?" re-recorded by Jeremy Redmore of Midnight Youth. It was the first time the artist had allowed one of his tracks to be used by a commercial entity. The proceeds from the first 20,000 downloads of the soundtrack went to the NZ Music Foundation of which Finn is patron.

In 2012, the bank also released an iPhone mobile banking app, following the roll out of a redesigned Kiwibank website. Standard & Poor lowered Kiwibank's credit rating one level from AA− to A+ (outlook stable) and Kiwibank reported a record after tax profit of $79.1 million for the year ended 30 June 2012.

In 2014, Kiwibank launched its "Independence" advertising campaign where it "compares itself to anyone who has ever immigrated to New Zealand".

In 2016, New Zealand Post announced the completion of the sales of 25 percent of Kiwibank to the New Zealand Superannuation Fund and 22 percent to the Accident Compensation Corporation.

On 22 August 2022, the New Zealand Government purchased Kiwibank's holdings company Kiwi Group Capital Limited for an estimated NZ$2.1 billion. As a result, the Government acquired full control of the state-owned bank from the New Zealand Superannuation Fund, ACC, and New Zealand Post. In response to the Government's purchase of Kiwibank, KiwiSaver providers opined that the Government could have offered to partially sell shares to the public. The opposition ACT Party's leader David Seymour called for a partial sale of Kiwibank's shares to pension funds. Similarly, the opposition National Party questioned the Labour Government's ability to run Kiwibank.

In June 2024 the Commerce Commission filed 21 criminal charges against Kiwibank alleging systemic breaches of the Fair Trading Act 1986. The alleged breaches related to issues causing more than $7 million in overcharges to over 36,000 customers for fees and interest rates in relation to home loans, credit cards and overdrafts, over several years dating back to 2002. In mid July 2024, Kiwibank pleaded guilty to charges of "systemic breaches" of the Fair Trading Act 1986.

=== Bid for TSB ===
On 25 August 2026, Kiwibank's parent Kiwi Group Capital Limited made a bid to purchase Taranaki Savings Bank (TSB) from its parent, the community trust Toi Foundation. Heartland Group Holdings, owners of NZX-listed Heartland Bank had a bid before the Toi Foundation to purchase TSB at the same time, leading commentators to describe Kiwibank's bid as an "eleventh hour", which chairman David Mclean described as "... asuperior proposal" and that Kiwibank would be the "better partner" for TSB.

== Core business activities ==
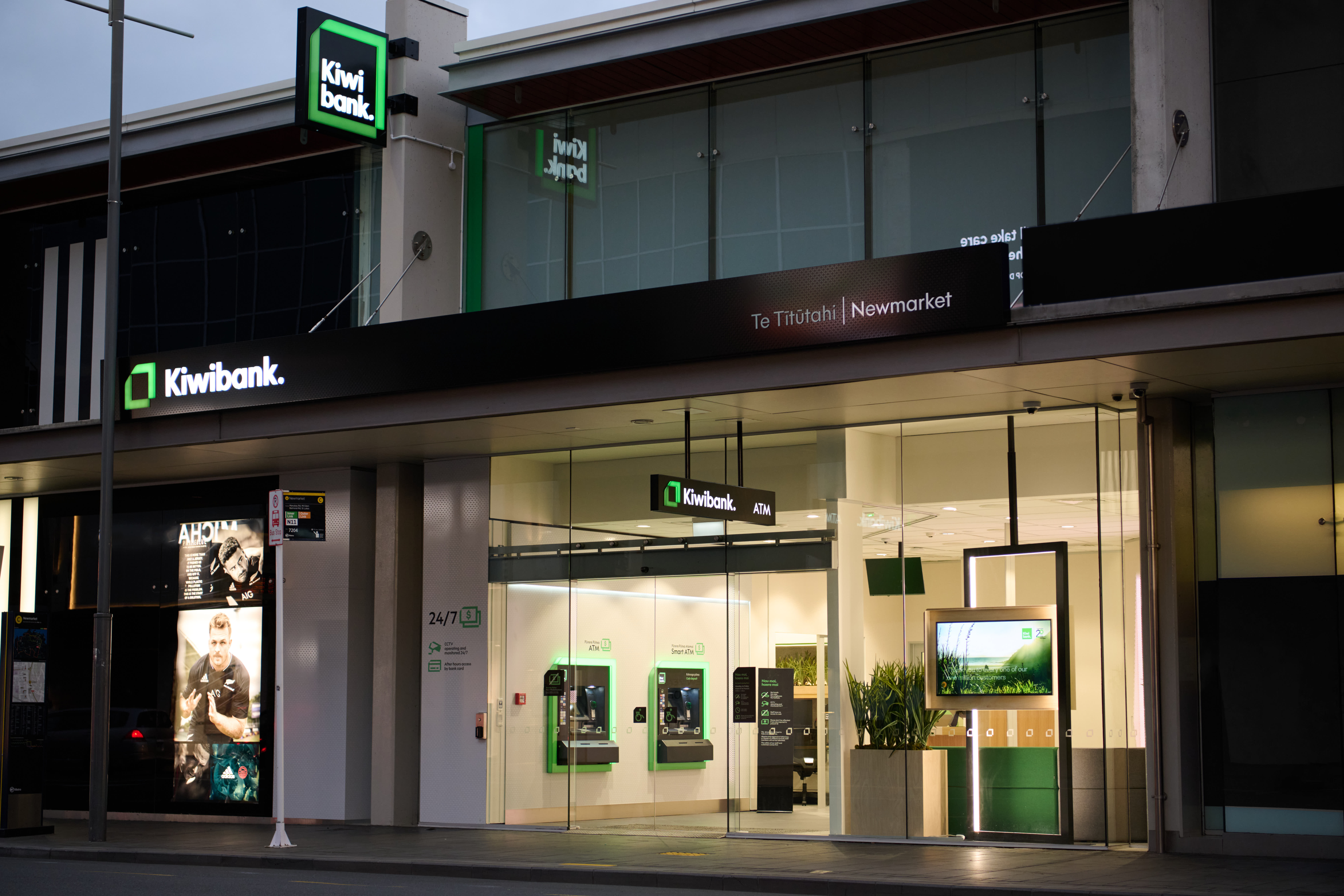
A Kiwibank branch in Newmarket

Kiwibank's core business consists of personal banking, business banking, KiwiSaver and other wealth services. Personal banking products and services include home loans, personal loans, credit cards, everyday accounts, savings accounts, investment services and insurance products. Business banking products and services include business lending, cheque accounts, credit cards, investments, merchant services, payment services and insurance.

== Investments ==
Kiwibank invested NZ$8m into a 51% shareholding in New Zealand Home Loans, a home loan lender specialising in debt reduction, in June 2006, and increased this in 2008 by a further 25% and took 100% in 2012. New Zealand Home Loans continues to grow offering an alternative to the traditional banking model and has a nationwide network of over 75 franchises.

In 2012, Kiwi Group Holdings (the parent company of Kiwibank) purchased Gareth Morgan Investments (GMI) for an undisclosed sum. In August 2013 GMI reached a milestone of $2 billion funds under management. In 2015, GMI was re-branded to Kiwi Wealth, offering global investment management and private portfolio services to retail high-net-worth, pension funds and institutional clients. In 2018, Kiwi Wealth's assets under management surpass $6 billion.

== Awards ==
Kiwibank has won the Sunday Star Times/Cannex banking awards, in 2006, 2007, 2008, 2009, 2010 and 2012 for offering the best value across their range of products. It has also won New Zealand's Most Trusted Bank at the Reader's Digest Trusted Brand Awards from 2006 to 2017.

CANSTAR Awards include:

- Bank of the Year for First Home Buyers 2011, 2012, 2013, 2014, 2015, 2015, 2016, 2017
- Best Value Term Deposit Award 2015, 2014, 2016

Other awards won by Kiwibank include:

- Bank of the Year – New Zealand, The Banker, 2009, 2010
- Sunday Star-Times' Bank of the Year, 2006, 2007, 2008, 2009, 2010, 2012
- Global Finance Best Bank in New Zealand 2013
- Supreme Award from the AUT Business School Excellence in Business Support Awards 2013
- Roy Morgan Major Bank of the Year Award 2012, 2013, 2014, 2015, 2015, 2016

In 2015 the Kiwi Wealth KiwiSaver Scheme (run by GMI) was awarded the inaugural Consumer NZ People's Choice Award.

== Sponsorships ==
Kiwibank was one of the major sponsors of The Block NZ in 2012–2014.

In 2012 it took up sponsorship of the CFA Institute Research Challenge hosted by the CFA Society of New Zealand.

New Zealand's first FinTech Accelerator was set up in 2016 with Kiwibank sponsorship. The 2018 Kiwibank FinTech Accelerator three month business growth programme resulted in seven start ups and was also supported by Xero, MasterCard and Microsoft. The businesses were: AccountingPod, Tapi (formally FlatFish), Liberac, Sharesies, Teddy, Wicket and a Xero team. In July 2019 the Kiwibank FinTech Accelerator intake included BankEngine, Cove Insurance, and Miuwi.

Kiwibank is the major sponsor of the New Zealander of the Year Awards.

A partnership with the children's financial literacy provider Banqer was formally launched in May 2016, setting the one-year goal at 1000 classrooms being sponsored into the programme. This was achieved by April 2017 but the programme continues to grow.

In 2016 Kiwibank announced a partnership with the Predator Free New Zealand Trust and the Department of Conservation (DOC). Kiwibank worked with PFNZ to establish the Kiwibank Predator Free Communities Programme which works with communities wanting to take up the predator-free challenge.

== See also ==
- List of banks in New Zealand
- Buck (Kiwibank mascot)
