= List of banks in New Zealand =

This is a list of banks in New Zealand.

== Central bank ==
The Reserve Bank of New Zealand (RBNZ), headquartered in Wellington, was established in 1934.

== Registered banks ==
=== Incorporated in New Zealand ===
According to the latest data from the Reserve Bank of New Zealand, as of 7 November 2025, there are 15 banks incorporated in New Zealand. Following the enactment of the Deposit Takers Act 2023, all of these locally incorporated institutions are covered by the Depositor Compensation Scheme (DCS).

Among these banks, ANZ, ASB, BNZ and Westpac are considered the "Big Four".

Banks incorporated in New Zealand
Bank name	Headquarters	Established
ANZ Bank New Zealand	Auckland	1 April 1987
ASB Bank	Auckland	11 May 1989
Bank of Baroda (New Zealand)	Auckland	1 September 2009
Bank of China (New Zealand)	Auckland	21 November 2014
Bank of India (New Zealand)	Auckland	31 March 2011
Bank of New Zealand	Auckland	1 April 1987
China Construction Bank (New Zealand)	Auckland	15 July 2014
Heartland Bank	Auckland	17 December 2012
Industrial and Commercial Bank of China (New Zealand)	Auckland	19 November 2013
Kiwibank	Wellington	29 November 2001
Rabobank New Zealand	Hamilton	7 July 1999
Southland Building Society	Invercargill	7 October 2008
The Co-operative Bank	Wellington	26 October 2011
TSB Bank	New Plymouth	8 June 1989
Westpac New Zealand	Auckland	31 October 2006

==== Retail bank rankings ====
Presented below is a ranking of retail bank based on CET1 capital accumulation within all local banking subsidiaries as of September 2025.

Common Equity Tier 1 (CET1) capital, as defined under the Basel III framework, represents the highest quality and most loss-absorbing form of a bank’s capital, consisting mainly of common shares and retained earnings; unlike total assets, which indicate the size of a bank’s balance sheet, CET1 reflects its core financial strength and is widely regarded as the most reliable measure of a bank’s solvency and resilience under stress.

Retail bank ranked by CET1 capital (as of September 2025)
Bank	CET1 cap. (NZ$m)	CET1 ratio
ANZ Bank New Zealand	18,185.6	12.9%
Bank of New Zealand	13,025.5	13.6%
ASB Bank	11,845.6	14.3%
Westpac New Zealand	9,958.0	12.0%
Kiwibank	2,624.0	11.6%
Rabobank New Zealand	2,527.3	15.9%
Heartland Bank	1,162.0	13.8%
TSB Bank	812.8	15.8%
Southland Building Society	535.4	14.4%
China Construction Bank (New Zealand)	365.2	20.3%
Industrial and Commercial Bank of China (New Zealand)	354.6	17.7%
Bank of China (New Zealand)	351.7	16.3%
The Co-operative Bank	265.7	15.9%
Bank of India (New Zealand)	64.3	38.3%
Bank of Baroda (New Zealand)	54.1	65.1%

=== Incorporated outside New Zealand ===
According to the latest data from the Reserve Bank of New Zealand, as of 7 November 2025, there are 12 banks incorporated outside operating as branches within the country. Under the regulatory framework established by the Deposit Takers Act 2023, these overseas-incorporated branches are not covered by the Depositor Compensation Scheme.

Banks incorporated outside the New Zealand
Bank name	Headquarters	Established
Australia and New Zealand Banking Group	Australia	5 January 2009
Bank of China	China	29 March 2018
China Construction Bank Corporation	China	21 December 2017
Citibank, N.A.	United States	22 July 1987
Commonwealth Bank of Australia	Australia	23 June 2000
Industrial and Commercial Bank of China	China	18 May 2020
JPMorgan Chase Bank, N.A.	United States	1 October 2007
Kookmin Bank	South Korea	14 July 1997
MUFG Bank	Japan	1 March 2004
Cooperatieve Rabobank U.A. (trading as Rabobank Nederland)	Netherlands	1 April 1996
The Hongkong and Shanghai Banking Corporation	Hong Kong	22 July 1987
Westpac Banking Corporation	Australia	1 April 1987

=== Total assets ===
The data presented in the following table is compiled from official Reserve Bank of New Zealand statistics and the formal financial statements of individual banks, including those not currently integrated into RBNZ primary statistical outputs. Under RBNZ regulatory requirements, institutions operating both a local branch and a subsidiary are categorized as 'Dual Registered Bank'. To ensure a comprehensive representation of these entities activities, the financial statements of the Auckland Branch have been consolidated with those of the subsidiary banks, reflecting the total New Zealand-based operations as a single reporting unit.

Ranking of bank by total assets as of June 2025
Notes: ‡: The reported financial data has been consolidated to include the accounts of both the Auckland branch and the subsidiary bank.
Rank	Bank name	Total assets (NZ$m)	Total deposits (NZ$m)
1	Australia and New Zealand Banking Group^{‡}	205,738.5	142,652.0
	ANZ Bank New Zealand	205,506.8	142,652.0
2	Commonwealth Bank of Australia^{‡}	138,345.9	89,205.1
	ASB Bank	135,163.5	89,226.5
3	Bank of New Zealand	136,404.8	87,929.7
4	Westpac Banking Corporation^{‡}	134,263.7	80,045.8
	Westpac New Zealand	123,948.5	80,193.6
5	Kiwibank	40,659.6	30,336.7
6	Cooperatieve Rabobank U.A.^{‡}	20,351.7	7,359.2
	Rabobank New Zealand	16,658.1	7,133.9
7	TSB Bank	9,551.4	8,570.5
8	JPMorgan Chase Bank, N.A. Auckland Branch	8,353.9	986.7
9	Bank of China^{‡}	7,197.4	2,775.0
	Bank of China (New Zealand)	3,815.4	2,349.6
10	Southland Building Society	6,676.7	4,472.5
11	MUFG Bank Auckland Branch	6,436.6 (March 2025)	2,820.0 (March 2025)
12	HSBC Bank Auckland Branch	6,161.9	3,430.6
13	Heartland Bank	5,892.8	4,359.2
14	Industrial and Commercial Bank of China^{‡}	4,842.6	1,015.1
	Industrial and Commercial Bank of China (New Zealand)	2,611.8	1,015.5
15	China Construction Bank Corporation^{‡}	4,622.7	405.5
	China Construction Bank (New Zealand)	2,517.6	410.0
16	The Co-operative Bank	3,689.6	3,233.3
17	Citibank, N.A. Auckland Branch	3,012.8	1,394.9
18	Kookmin Bank Auckland Branch	254.8	138.3
19	Bank of India (New Zealand)	184.4	106.5
20	Bank of Baroda (New Zealand)	119.5	63.6

== Non-bank deposit takers ==
According to the latest data from the Reserve Bank of New Zealand, as of 29 April 2025, there are 15 non-bank deposit takers incorporated in New Zealand. Following the enactment of the Deposit Takers Act 2023, all of these locally incorporated institutions are covered by the Depositor Compensation Scheme except FE Investments.

Non-bank deposit takers in New Zealand
Bank name	Headquarters	Established
Christian Savings	Auckland	9 January 2017
FE Investments (in receivership)	Auckland	16 March 2015
Finance Direct	Auckland	13 February 2015
First Credit Union Incorporated	Hamilton	3 May 2015
General Finance	Auckland	13 February 2015
Gold Band Finance	Christchurch	29 April 2015
Heretaunga Building Society	Hastings	23 December 2014
Liberty Financial	Auckland	17 April 2015
Mutual Credit Finance	Christchurch	27 March 2015
Nelson Building Society	Nelson	23 March 2015
Police and Families Credit Union	Wellington	11 December 2014
Unity Credit Union	Hastings	19 December 2014
Wairarapa Building Society	Masterton	4 August 2015
Welcome	Havelock North	1 June 2025
Xceda Finance	Auckland	3 November 2015

== See also ==
- List of banks in Oceania
- History of the banking sector in New Zealand
