= ECCT =

ECCT may refer to:

- Enhanced Computer-Controlled Teletext, an electronic circuit for Teletext
- Eau Claire Children's Theatre, in Eau Claire, Wisconsin, US
- Eastern & Central Community Trust, owner of Eastern & Central Savings Bank, a former New Zealand bank
