= Westpac New Zealand =

New Zealand bank

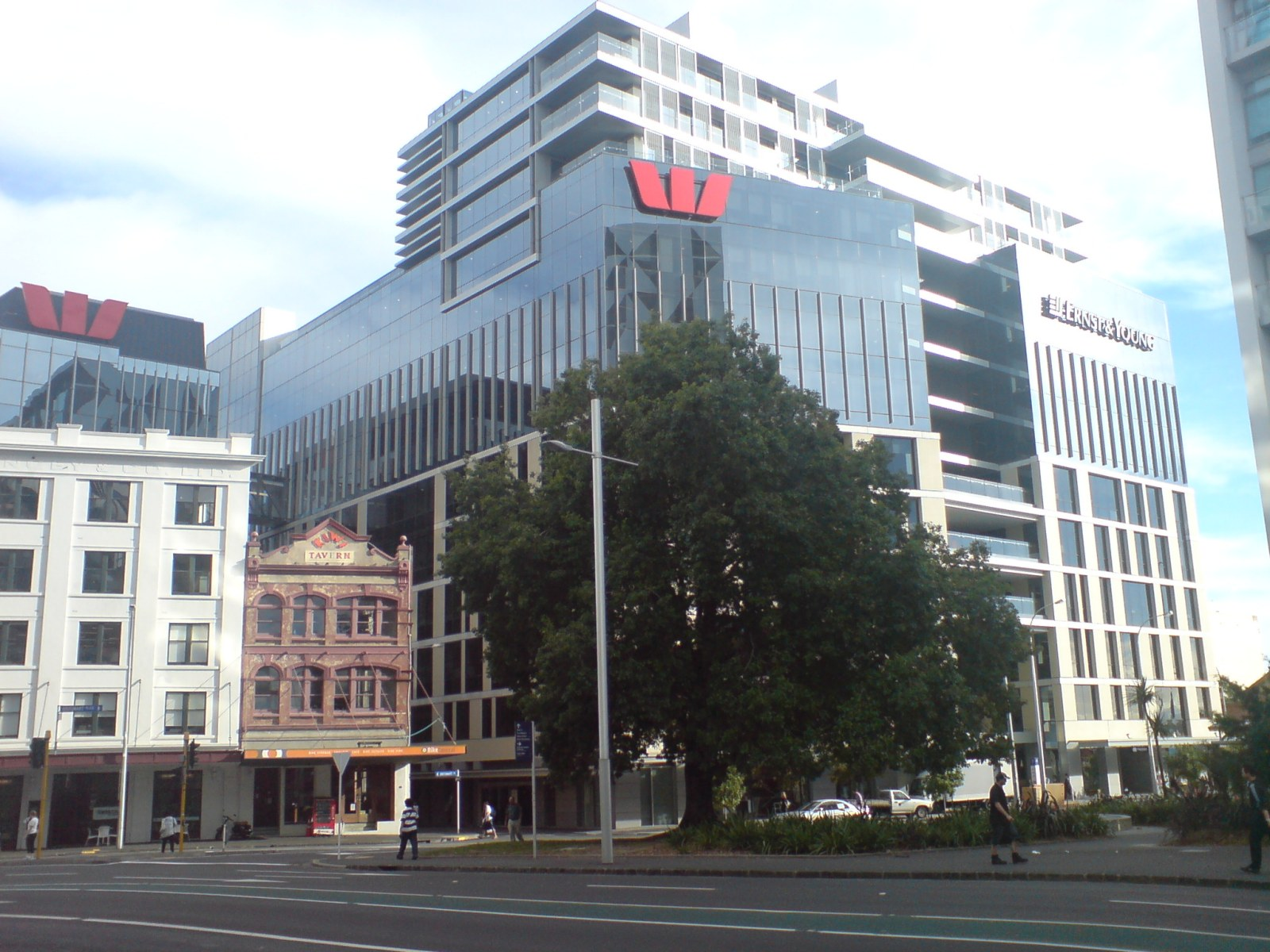
- Westpac NZ's head office, Takutai Square in Auckland
- Type: Subsidiary
- Traded as: NZX: WBC
- Industry: Financial services
- Predecessor: Bank of New South Wales, Trust Bank (New Zealand)
- Founded: 1861 (as the Bank of New South Wales)
- Headquarters: Auckland, New Zealand
- Area served: New Zealand
- Key people: Catherine McGrath (CEO), Pip Greenwood (Chair)
- Products: Finance and insurance, Retail banking, corporate banking, private banking, mortgages, credit cards, loans
- Number of employees: 5,500 (2023)
- Parent: Westpac
- Rating: AA− (S&P; as of November 2024)
- Website: westpac.co.nz

Westpac New Zealand, known simply as Westpac, is a New Zealand bank that is a subsidiary of Australian multinational banking group Westpac Banking Corporation. The bank is one of New Zealand's big four banks. It operates under the same brand as its parent but is operationally separated as required by the New Zealand banking regulator the Reserve Bank of New Zealand.

It provides retail banking and commercial banking services across New Zealand and operates 196 branches and 500 ATMs. It provides retail, business, agribusiness and institutional banking services. With KiwiSaver and wealth management provided by its subsidiary BTNZ. In addition to individuals and companies the bank provides banking services to the New Zealand Government. As of June 2022, it is the third largest bank in New Zealand, with a market share of 19%.

The bank was established as the Australian Bank of New South Wales and opened its first branches in New Zealand in the 1860s to service the Otago gold rush. The bank of New South Wales acquired the Commercial Bank of Australia in 1981 before being renamed to Westpac in 1982. Its name is a portmanteau of "Western" and "Pacific". In 1996 it acquired the Trust Bank, significantly expanding its New Zealand operations.

== History ==
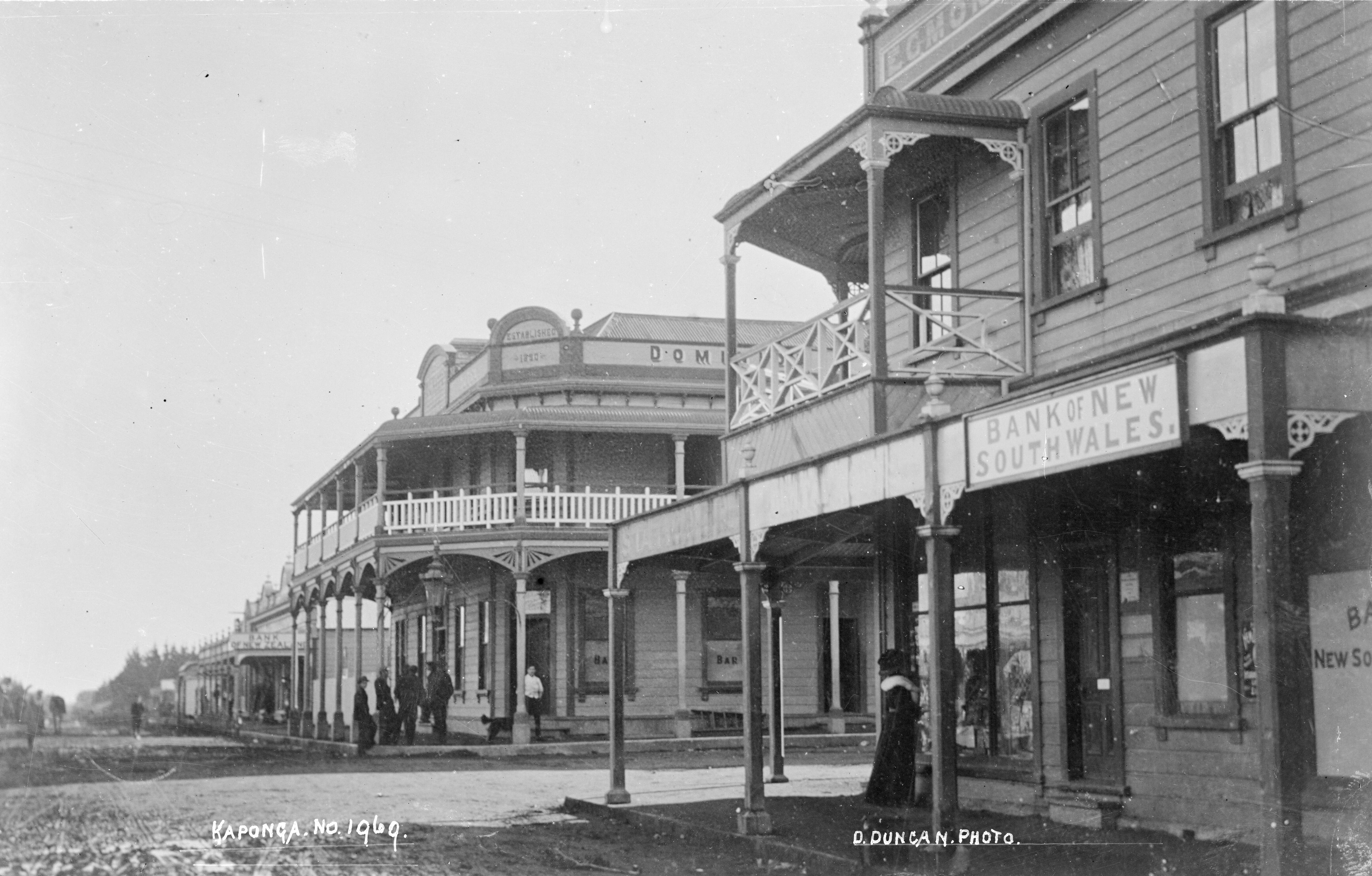
Bank of New South Wales branch on right in Kaponga circa 1910

In 1861 the Bank of New South Wales opened seven branches in New Zealand.

In 1982, the New Zealand parliament passed special legislation to consolidate the New Zealand operations during the merger of the Bank of New South Wales and the Commercial Bank of Australia. The act of parliament was known as the Westpac Banking Corporation Act 1982.

In 1996 the community trusts sold Trust Bank of New Zealand to Westpac for $1.2 billion. The two banks merged as WestpacTrust, although the word trust was phased out by 2002.

In 2002, Westpac NZ appointed the first female CEO of any New Zealand bank, with the appointment of Ann Sherry.

In 2004, the Reserve Bank of New Zealand required Westpac to split its New Zealand business and locally incorporate as part of its effort to make sure the bank in New Zealand operated for the benefit of New Zealand. Westpac resisted the move for over one year but eventually agreed to locally incorporate. It created two new entities, Westpac New Zealand Limited, a locally incorporated subsidiary of Westpac Banking Corporation, and Westpac Banking Corporation New Zealand Branch, a branch of Westpac Banking Corporation.

On 29 September 2006 the New Zealand Commerce Commission fined Westpac NZ$5.1 million for hidden foreign transaction fees, with most of the fine being reimbursement to affected customers, in the order of 12% of the fees actually charged. All other banks operating in New Zealand had either already been fined or were awaiting a court case.

In April 2009, Westpac mistakenly increased the overdraft limit of service station operator Leo Gao and his girlfriend Kara Hurring to $10 million instead of the approved $100,000. This sparked the "runaway millionaire" case where Gau and Hurring took $6 million from the account and went on the run overseas. They were finally arrested in 2011 and charged in 2012 but $3.8 million of the missing money was never recovered.

In October 2009, Westpac NZ was required to pay NZ$961 million to the Inland Revenue Department in avoided taxes.

The Headquarters of Westpac New Zealand was moved to Auckland City's Takutai Square in 2011.

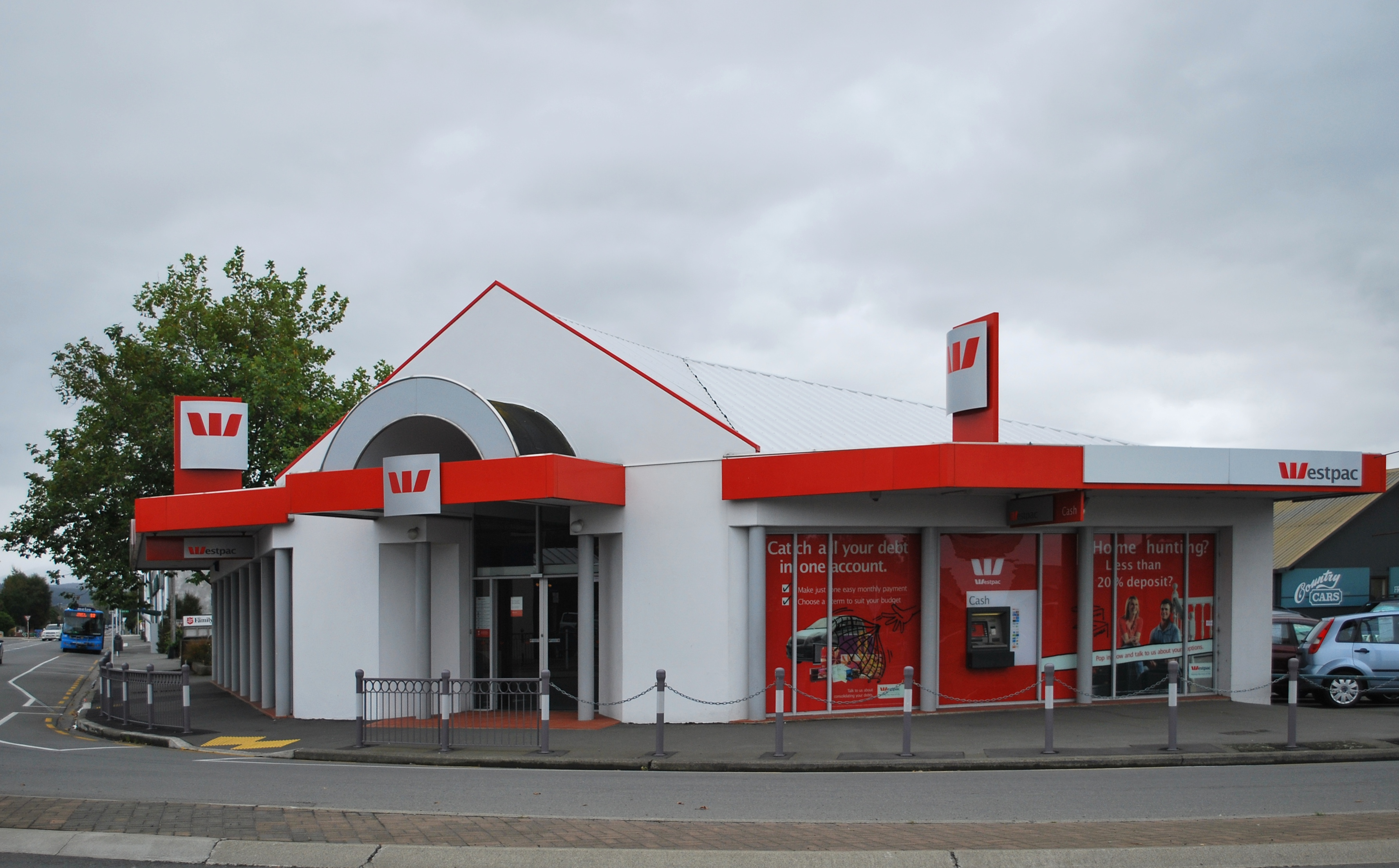
Westpac Bank branch in Rangiora

On 22 July 2014, the firm announced that it would pilot a host card emulation (HCE) mobile payments technology to customers. It was the first bank in New Zealand to actively bring HCE mobile payments to market and one of only a handful of banks globally to be using the 'digital wallet' technology. After three-month trial, using Carta Worldwide HCE technology, customers could use their Android smartphones as digital wallets. Soon after, in August 2014, Westpac NZ announced that it would be releasing the world's first augmented bank app, which added layers of functionality to the digital wallet by enabling users to check account balances, view previous spending behaviours, pay bills and locate their nearest Westpac NZ branch or ATM.

== Operations ==
=== Westpac Migrant Banking ===
This unit offers banking facilities to those migrating to New Zealand. Bank accounts for migrants can be opened before people arrive in the country, and credit cards and mortgages can be approved before arrival. Westpac Migrant Banking has a representative office in London where accounts can be arranged, although the process can be done remotely from any country.

Alongside its branch and digital-banking network, Westpac has introduced community-banking vans and staffed sites in libraries and shared community facilities. These provide non-cash services such as account opening, loan applications and assistance with digital banking.

=== Climate change risks to property ===
In 2026 Westpac announced they would share their assessments of the risks to individual properties of climate change effects, such as flooding and erosion, with potential property purchasers. The bank said they may reduce the amount of mortgage lending or the mortgage term on properties deemed to be at risk.

== Naming rights and sponsorship ==
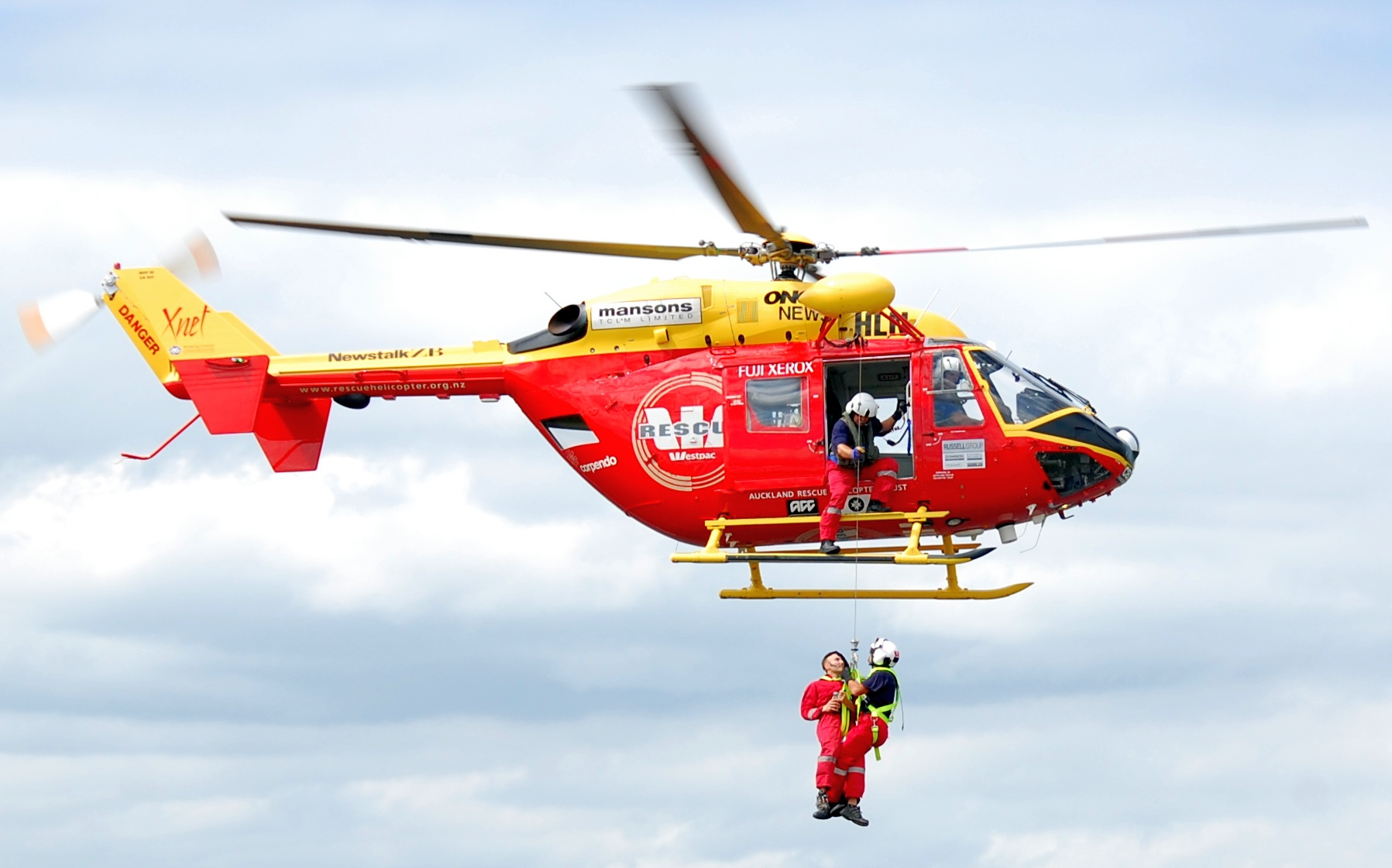
Westpac Rescue Helicopter in 2009

The bank has the following naming rights:

- Westpac Stadium in Wellington from 2000 to 2019.
- Westpac New Zealand Franchise Awards.
- Westpac Park Cricket Ground, Hamilton.

The bank sponsors rescue helicopter services in separate locations in New Zealand. These include:

- Westpac Rescue Helicopter (New Zealand)
- Westpac Life Flight (New Zealand)

== Controversies ==
=== Funding of coal mining in New Zealand ===
In 2014, Westpac came under criticism from 350.org for its role in funding mining company Bathurst Resources, which was permitted to mine coal on the Denniston Plateau, claiming that the mine would release up to 218 million tonnes of carbon dioxide.

=== Anti–money laundering breach ===
In 2021, the Reserve Bank issued a formal warning to Westpac for failing to comply with anti–money laundering rules. The Reserve Bank said Westpac's internal systems failed to detect and report almost 8,000 corporate transactions to overseas recipients.

=== Lending responsibility rules ===
In late November 2025, the High Court of New Zealand fines the bank NZ$3.64 million for breaching lender responsibility rules.

== See also ==
- Banking in New Zealand
- List of banks in New Zealand
- Westpac Stadium
- List of Westpac buildings
