= Buck (Kiwibank mascot) =

Kiwibank mascot

Buck the Sheep

Buck is the anthropomorphised green sheep mascot for Kiwibank, featured heavily in the animated Bank Kiwi advertising campaign. In late 2026 Buck received significant attention after social media users reported finding the character attractive, which grew into controversy following Kiwibank's decision to send American DMCA takedowns of involved posts.

== Creation and advertising campaign ==
Buck as a character was originally developed by Kiwibank in collaboration with advertising agency Special New Zealand. VFX studio Fathom brought Buck to life over the course of multiple months, giving the CGI model over four million individual strands of simulated green wool.

Buck's design was intended to embody the concept of "bucking" the status-quo and moving beyond the flock to greener pastures, an analogue meant to embody switching to Kiwibank from larger international alternatives.

Buck was first seen in the "Bank Kiwi" advertising campaign, which started July 2026.

== Public reception ==
On 24 July 2026, X user @ehukuu posted a joke about finding Buck attractive, accompanied by an image of Buck at a hairdresser, receiving a moderate amount of attention on the platform. Quoting this post, user @MaoistStdEn expanded on the joke, stating that "years of efforts" to dispel the stereotype of New Zealanders having sex with sheep, had been undone; this post gained significantly more attention, gaining over 93,000 likes.

Following this, sexualised jokes and fan art depicting Buck spread across social media platforms, including X, Reddit and Bluesky. Buck also attracted attention from online furry communities, with some citing Buck's appearance and personality as reasons for the character's popularity.

Satirical news site The Civilian wrote an article joking that the Green Party proposed to nationalise Buck, calling the character a "national treasure".

== Copyright controversy ==
On 16 September 2026, law firm MinterEllisonRuddWatts, acting on behalf of Kiwibank, began issuing takedown notices under the United States Digital Millennium Copyright Act (DMCA) to X and Bluesky. The notices accused users of using Buck to create highly sexualised material which infringed the bank's copyright. The Spinoff reported that at least ten X accounts and multiple Bluesky artists faced takedown requests.

The takedowns prompted backlash, with social media users criticising the notices as excessive and arguing that they targeted jokes and artistic expression. Some users disputed the characterisation of their posts as sexualised copies of Buck, while an artist on Bluesky reported that their unrelated artwork had also been removed. Kiwibank stated that it had taken "reasonable steps to protect others from harmful content and to address the misuse of Kiwibank intellectual property". The takedowns subsequently prompted further jokes and posts about Buck, renewing attention towards the character in what's been described as an example of the Streisand effect.

On 8 October 2026, the New Zealand Free Speech Union published an open letter to Kiwibank chief executive Steve Jurkovich, calling on them to withdraw the takedown notices. The letter supported the proposed Copyright (Parody and Satire) Amendment Bill, arguing that the controversy highlighted issues with the use of copyright enforcement against parody and satire.

On 12 October 2026, American talk-show Last Week Tonight aired a segment featuring Buck, detailing the history and controversy surrounding the character.
