= BankDirect =

- Type: Subsidiary
- Industry: Finance and Insurance
- Founded: 1997
- Defunct: 2017
- Headquarters: New Zealand
- Products: Internet and Phone based bank offering an integrated range of financial products and services for personal customers
- Parent: ASB
- Website: www.bankdirect.co.nz

BankDirect was a direct banking division of the Australian owned ASB bank, which provided internet and phone based banking in New Zealand. It was formed in 1997 as a "virtual" bank without any physical branches, and operated for twenty years.

BankDirect's customer base began to shrink in the 2010s. In 2017, ASB migrated remaining customers to their other services, citing the drop in demand due to standardisation of online banking and other virtual services, which were already offered by their main brand.

== History ==
BankDirect was founded in October 1997, and was the first "virtual" bank to operate in New Zealand via Internet and phone without any physical branches. BankDirect used the leverage of not having physical branches to offer lower home loan interest rates and higher interest rates on their savings accounts, however this rate was adjusted in line with ASB's main services in 2010.

In 2012, ASB reported the service had 30,000 customers. By 2017, that number had dropped to an estimated 10,000. ASB cited online banking as one cause for a drop in customers, and announced it would migrate remaining customers to its other services.
