= Sovereign Services =

New Zealand life and health insurer

Sovereign Services Limited
- Company type: Subsidiary
- Industry: Life Insurance, Health Insurance, Home Loans, Investments and Superannuation
- Founded: 1989
- Defunct: 5 August 2019
- Headquarters: Auckland, New Zealand
- Key people: Nick Stanhope, Chief Executive Officer
- Products: Comprehensive and integrated range of financial products and services
- Number of employees: 700+
- Parent: AIA Group
- Website: www.sovereign.co.nz

Sovereign Services Limited (branded as Sovereign) was a New Zealand-based financial services company that provided life and health insurance, home loans, investment and superannuation products. It was a subsidiary of the AIA Group.

== History ==
Sovereign started out in 1989 as a life insurance and investment provider. The company expanded in 1996 with its acquisition of Metropolitan Life Assurance Company.

In 1998, Sovereign was acquired by the ASB Group, which is owned by the Commonwealth Bank. When The Commonwealth Bank merged with Colonial Mutual in 2000, the Colonial New Zealand life and investment business was integrated with Sovereign, making it the largest life insurer in New Zealand.

Sovereign maintained a market share of around 29% to 30% of in-force premiums over the five years up to 2011.

Sovereign currently has a financial strength rating of A+ (Superior) from international rating agency A.M. Best (awarded December, 2011).

Sovereign is one of over 900 signatories for the Principles for Responsible Investment. The initiative was designed and developed by the United Nations Environment Programme Finance Initiative, and is a set of aspirational and voluntary guidelines for investment entities wishing to address environmental, social, and corporate governance (ESG) issues.

In 2011, Sovereign hosted a United Nations-facilitated ‘Principles for Sustainable Insurance’ Regional Consultation Meeting for Oceania, which will help develop new sustainability principles for the global insurance sector.

In September 2017 the Commonwealth Bank agreed terms to sell Sovereign, as well as its Australian insurance business (CommInsure) to AIA Group for AUD $3.8 billion. The sale was completed on 2 July 2018.

AIA New Zealand and Sovereign continued to operate as two separate brands until 5 August 2019. From this date onwards the combined business has traded as AIA New Zealand Limited.
