= Ira Goldstein =

Fictional advertising character portrayed by Steve Mellor

- Ira Goldstein (right) explains "FastCheque" (internet person-to-person money transfer) to his boss in 2006
- Agency: TBWA / Whybin
- Client: ASB Bank
- Release date(s): January 2000–September 2010

Ira Goldstein is a fictional character played by Steve Mellor, who appeared in television and radio commercials for ASB Bank in New Zealand. The commercials were screened from January 2000 to October 2010 and were produced by TBWA / Whybin agency.

In the commercials, Goldstein worked as an employee for a New York City bank and was sent to New Zealand by his boss R. J. Lincoln (played by Australian actor Bruce Venables) to "find out what makes that bank different". The first commercial in the series featured Goldstein explaining to his boss that people perceive all banks to be the same, with one exception – the ASB Bank. Initially, Goldstein's boss believed his bank is the one exception until he finds out it is located in New Zealand, to his bewilderment.

His boss appeared in most advertisements, usually by telephone from his New York office. However he did make visits to New Zealand to meet Goldstein, and to check up on him.

== Personal life ==
Goldstein is a high-flyer, single and lives in a palatial Auckland home. However Goldstein's own car is an unlikely element of surprise. Rather than an expensive late-model one, he was shown over 2006–2007 chauffeuring his boss around Auckland in a metallic-brown 1979 Princess 2000 HL. Since moving to New Zealand to investigate ASB, Goldstein has started his own business and purchased property (presumably thanks to the helpful bank), but must always keep his activities under wraps when his boss is around.

Goldstein also has difficulty at one particular branch due to his attraction to a female worker at the bank.

== Awards ==
The Goldstein series has won several awards from the Communications Association Agency New Zealand (CAANZ). The first award came in 2001, with the 'Herd' of Chickens commercial receiving the Highly Commended award. The Sustained Success Bronze award and the Consumer Services Gold award were received in 2002. In 2003 the campaign received the CAANZ People's Choice Award and the Sustained Success bronze award. 2004 saw the bronze award for the Switching – Easy radio commercial and another People's Choice Award for the campaign.

== Campaign end ==
On 26 June 2010, it was announced that due to ASB Bank dropping advertising agency TBWA / Whybin, the Goldstein campaign would end.

In Ira's final commercial, which first screened on 27 September 2010, Ira is called back home to New York at the end of his New Zealand assignment, however, he cannot resist calling his ASB personal banker who reminds him of his (by now) huge bagel business. Goldstein immediately returns to New Zealand to re-assume management of his bagel empire and once again take possession of his palatial Auckland home. Soon, however, his former boss arrives on his doorstep, destitute after being fired (possibly due to economic recession, although this is not clarified). Ira tells him to go to New York and find out what makes their bagels different, thereby turning the first commercial in the series on its head (Ira was originally ordered by his boss to go to New Zealand to find out what made ASB Bank different).

At its conclusion, the Goldstein campaign had produced approximately sixty commercials and had run for eleven years.

== Controversy ==
New Zealand's Jewish community, which perceived Goldstein as an unfortunate stereotype, expressed initial resistance to the advertising character. The popularity and success of the character has, however, largely mollified any initial concerns.

ASB Bank pulled the Ira Goldstein commercials from air for several weeks following the World Trade Center attacks of September 2001, out of respect and for fear of causing offence with their image of a bumbling New York banker.

One commercial that showed Goldstein comparing Rotorua's boiling mud pools to the opening of the World Trade Center was altered in the wake of "9/11". The line of dialogue in question changed so that Goldstein merely commented on the presence of the mud.
