= ANZ Bank New Zealand =

Retail bank in New Zealand

ANZ Bank New Zealand Limited
- Logo used since 2009
- Type: Subsidiary
- Industry: Banking; Financial services
- Founded: 26 September 2012; 14 years ago
- Headquarters: Auckland, New Zealand
- Key people: Scott St John (Chairman); Antonia Watson (CEO)
- Products: Transaction accounts, insurance, stock brokerage, investment banking, asset-based lending, consumer finance
- Operating income: ▲NZ$4.19 billion (2021)
- Net income: ▲NZ$1.94 billion (2021)
- Total assets: ▲NZ$184.77 billion (2021)
- Total equity: ▲NZ$16.89 billion (2021)
- Number of employees: 9,000
- Parent: Australia and New Zealand Banking Group
- Rating: AA− (S&P)
- Website: www.anz.co.nz

ANZ Bank New Zealand Limited (or simply ANZ) is a New Zealand banking and financial services company, which operates as a subsidiary of Australia and New Zealand Banking Group Limited of Australia. ANZ is one of New Zealand's big four banks, and is the largest bank in New Zealand with approximately 30% of market share as of March 2021.

Australia and New Zealand Banking Group bought the National Bank of New Zealand from Lloyds Bank in 2003. The banks operated as separate brands until 2012, when they were unified under the ANZ brand. The company was renamed ANZ Bank New Zealand in 2012, following the withdrawal of the National Bank brand. ANZ provides a number of financial services, including banking services, asset finance, investments and payment services.

== History ==
=== 19th century ===
In 1840, Union Bank of Australia (UBA), a British bank with head office in London, agreed with the New Zealand Company to accompany settlers to New Zealand to provide them with banking services. UBA opened a branch in Petone, across the harbour from Wellington, where it transferred the branch shortly thereafter. Between 1840 and 1847 the Union Bank issued its own bank notes for circulation in New Zealand. These were initially issued under British law until 1844 when the New Zealand Governor signed an ordinance allowing the Bank to issue bank notes but required that these be a minimum of 1 pound and redeemable at demand for gold or silver.

In 1848, The Governor withdrew Union Bank's right to issue bank notes and transferred these rights to the Colonial Bank of Issue (CBI). UBA notes in circulation were withdrawn and replaced with CBI bank notes. UBA objected, and every day it took whatever CBI notes it had received that day to the CBI and demanded redemption in gold; when UBA's customers wanted to withdraw money, the bank paid them in gold rather than CBI notes. This policy, when combined with previous confusion related to the issue of NZ Government debt, and support from the local commercial community, resulted in the CBI ultimately being shut down. The same year, UBA opened a branch in Auckland, and a small number of branches elsewhere in the country followed. The following year, UBC resumed issuing bank notes in New Zealand under an act of the New Zealand Parliament. (The Paper Currency Act 1856). In 1864, Bank of Australasia, another London-based bank, opened branches in Auckland, Dunedin and Christchurch.

=== 20th century ===
In 1951, UBA and the Bank of Australasia merged to become the Australia and New Zealand Bank. In 1968, ANZ Bank joined Databank Systems Limited consortium to provide joint data processing services. Two years later, ANZ Bank merged with a third London-based bank, the English, Scottish and Australian Bank, to form ANZ Banking Group. In 1976, ANZ moved its corporate headquarters to Melbourne, Australia. In 1979, An Act of Parliament permitted ANZ to incorporate its branches in New Zealand as ANZ Banking Group (New Zealand) Ltd. ANZ sold 25% of the shares to the public. In 1983, ANZ opened its New Zealand head office in Wellington. In 1989, ANZ bought PostBank (the Post Office Savings Bank) from the New Zealand government in a privatization. Two years earlier, the Government had separated the Post Office's banking business into a separate entity to prepare it for sale. In 1999, ANZ launched internet banking.

=== 21st century ===
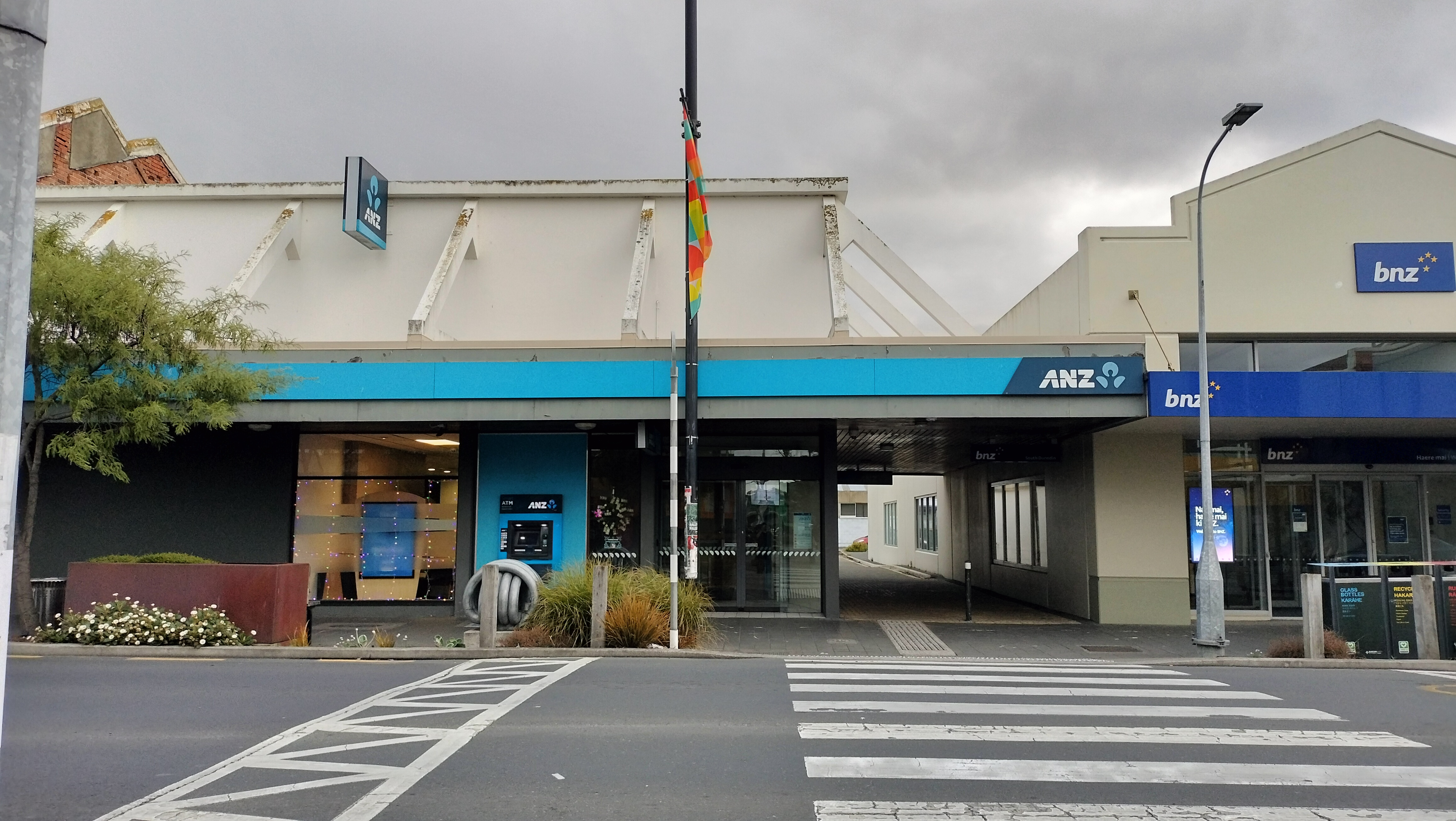
ANZ Bank in South Dunedin

In 2002, ING and ANZ formed a joint venture under the ING brand The following year, ANZ bought National Bank of New Zealand from Lloyds TSB. In 2008, ANZ launched a mobile application. The same year, ANZ announced around 400 jobs were to be moved to Bangalore, India.

In 2009, ANZ Group CEO Mike Smith announced the Group's "super regional strategy", saying the Bank aims to not be "Kiwi" or "Australian" but a global bank. In September 2010, ANZ New Zealand became the sole owner of ING New Zealand Limited, which formed part of ING; ING provided investment advice for the investment and insurance products sold by ANZ and The National Bank. ING New Zealand Limited changed its name to OnePath Limited in November 2010. The same year, David Hisco replaces outgoing Jenny Fagg as CEO ANZ New Zealand. On 26 September 2012, ANZ National Bank CEO David Hisco announced that the National Bank would re-brand as "ANZ" by the end of October. The name of the company would change to "ANZ Bank New Zealand Limited". The technology of the two banks was brought together from 29 October 2012, with customers being able to use branches branded ANZ or the National Bank from the same date. Branches branded the National Bank would change to the ANZ branding before the bank's trademark license expired in 2014. In May 2019, the Reserve Bank stripped ANZ of its accreditation to set and manage its capital reserves over persistent failures since 2014. In 2013, Onepath rebranded as ANZ Investments. In 2014, ANZ India got approval from Reserve Bank of India to open two branches in India. In 2015, ANZ announced ANZ ETFS joint venture with ETF Securities to offer 6 ETFs on ASX. In 2017, ANZ announced it would sell its online sharebroking service, Direct Broking, to investment bank, First NZ Capital (FNZC), for an undisclosed sum. The sale was completed in December 2018. In 2019, Antonia Watson replaced David Hisco as CEO of ANZ NZ.

In 2020, ANZ sold UDC Finance for $794 million to SBI Shinsei Bank. In September 2025, ANZ agreed to pay a fine of NZ$3.25 million to the New Zealand Government for breaching fair dealing laws twice between 2012 and 2023.

== Organisational structure ==
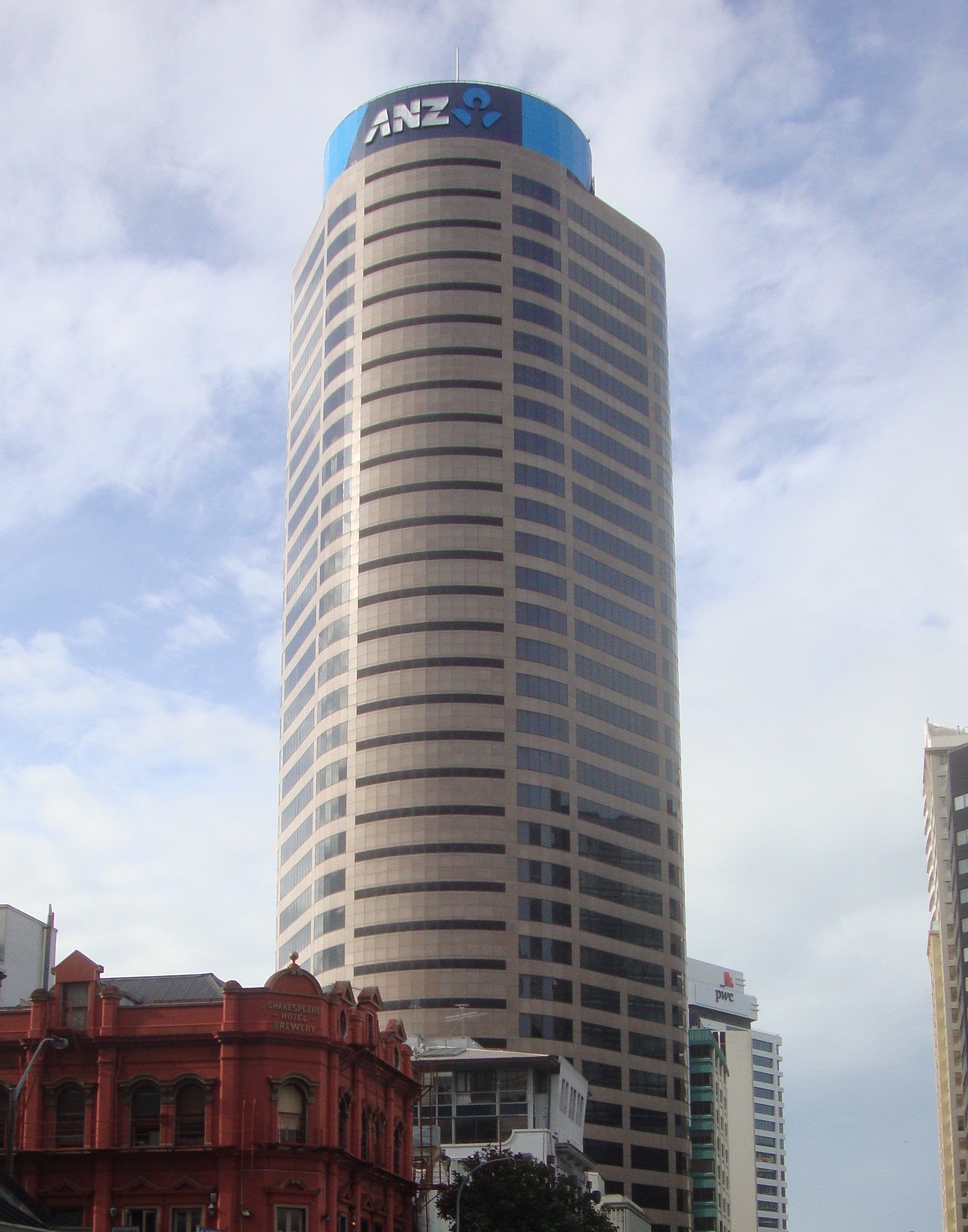
ANZ Centre in Auckland

ANZ NZ is wholly owned by Australia and New Zealand Banking Group Limited of Australia via two intermediates; ANZ Holdings (New Zealand) Limited and Pty Funds Limited (incorporated in Australia). The major shareholders of Australia and New Zealand Banking Group are BlackRock, The Vanguard Group and Norges Bank Investment Management.

=== Subsidiaries ===
ANZ NZ has previously owned the Direct Broking brand and UDC Finance. In December 2018, Direct Broking was sold to Jarden Securities Limited, however ANZ NZ maintains a strategic alliance with the brand. UDC Finance was sold to SBI Shinsei Bank in September 2020 for NZ$794 million. As of September 2020, ANZ's subsidiaries are:

- ANZ Investment Services (New Zealand) Ltd
- ANZ New Zealand Investments Ltd
- ANZ New Zealand Investments Nominees Ltd
- ANZ New Zealand (Int'l) Ltd
- ANZ Custodial Services New Zealand Ltd
- ANZ New Zealand Securities Ltd
- ANZ National Staff Superannuation Ltd
- Arawata Assets Ltd
- ANZ Wealth New Zealand Ltd
- Karapiro Investments Ltd
- Arawata Finance Ltd
- Endeavour Finance Ltd
- Oneanswer Nominees Ltd

=== Shareholdings ===
- Payments NZ Ltd
- Precinct Properties New Zealand Ltd
- Freightways Ltd
- Investment Link (New Zealand) Ltd
- Auckland International Airport Ltd

== Operations ==
=== Personal banking ===
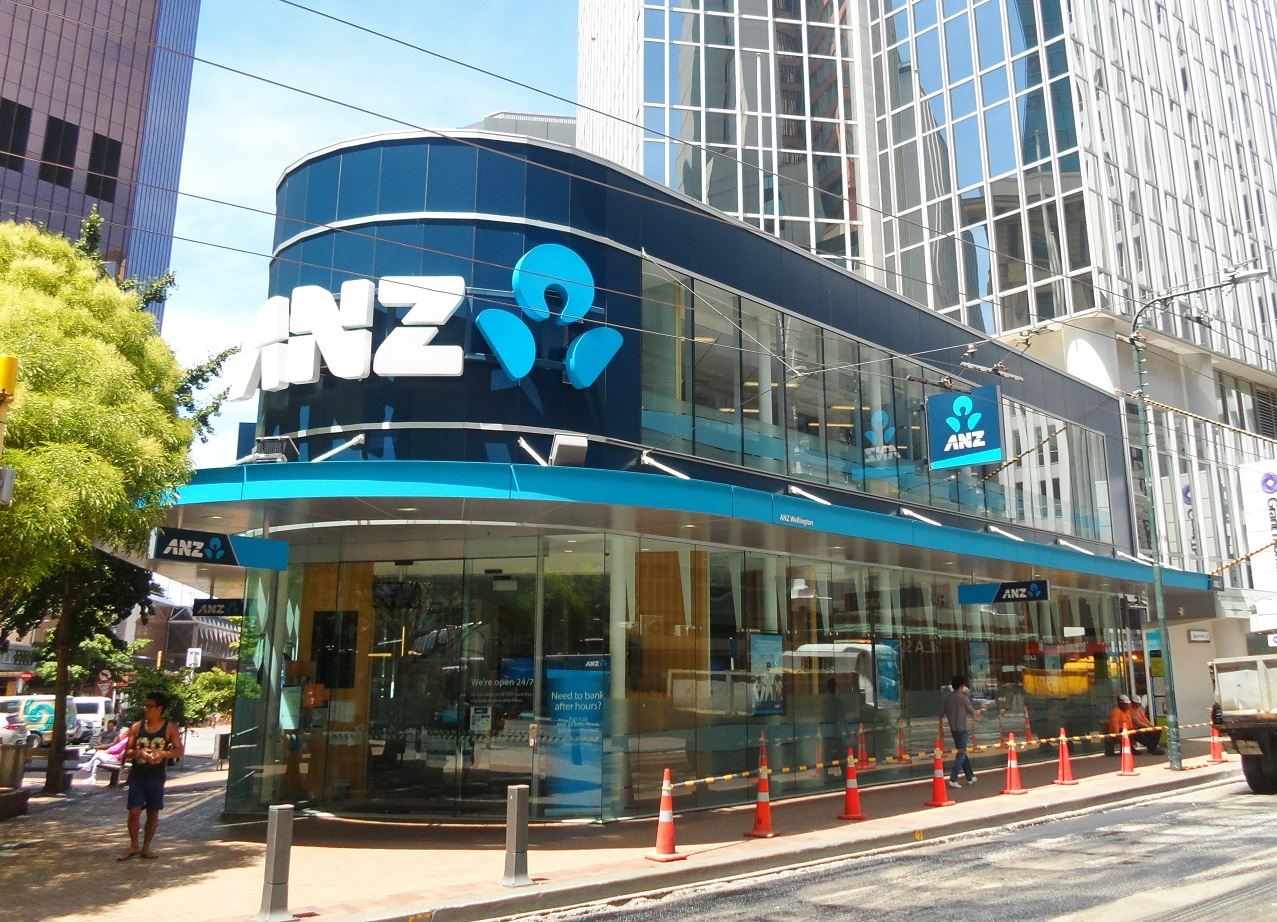
Former ANZ branch on Lambton Quay, Wellington

As a part of ANZ's personal banking services, the bank offers a number of different bank accounts, personal loans, home loans, a wealth management service, insurance and investment services.

==== Investment ====
ANZ Investments, is ANZ's subsidiary (previously ING) that manages investments. Currently it is the largest fund manager in NZ with approximately 745,000 customers. It is one of the nine Kiwisaver scheme managers appointed by the New Zealand Government in 2014.

==== Insurance ====
ANZ offers a number of insurance products through partnerships with different insurance companies including life and living insurance (Cigna Insurance), house insurance (Vero), contents insurance (Vero), car insurance (Vero) and travel insurance (Allianz Australia). The bank used to offer credit card repayment insurance, however since 2020, it no longer provides new policies.

==== Wealth management ====
ANZ has a wealth management service called private bank. The service provides investment management services, lending services (for personal, investment and commercial property loans), foreign currency accounts and services for foreign investors.

== Advertising and sponsorship ==
ANZ NZ sponsors a number of sporting entities and charities including New Zealand Cricket, Netball New Zealand, Paralympics New Zealand, the New Zealand Olympic Committee and the New Zealand Cancer Society. As of 2020, ANZ NZ donates NZ$15 million annually.

In 2017, ANZ spent $25 million on advertising annually, higher than any other bank in New Zealand.

=== 2016 Olympic Games ===
For the 2016 Olympic Games, the New Zealand Olympic Committee and ANZ NZ developed a cross platform mobile app to cover the game. During this advertising campaign, which featured heavy ANZ branding, the company experienced a 2 basis point increase in brand consideration.

=== COVID-19 pandemic ===
In response to the COVID-19 pandemic, ANZ NZ donated $2 million to the Women’s Refuge, Age Concern New Zealand, the Salvation Army, Red Cross and local charities in the Pacific, in addition to a $1 million grant to cricket and netball.

== Controversies ==
=== Hisco personal expenses ===
An internal review, by ANZ's integrity unit, found that former CEO David Hisco was charging chauffeur driven cars and wine storage as expenses without authorisation. The report also found that the CEO "took actions that reduced the likelihood of the personal expenses being detected, and did not report the benefit associated with the expenses".

=== Hisco family house purchase ===
In 2011, ANZ purchased a property in Auckland for $7.5 million and rented it to its then-CEO David Hisco free of charge. In 2017, the property was sold to Hisco's wife for $6.9 million when the property's capital value was $10.7 million according to quotable value data. While a Deloitte review cleared ANZ of wrongdoing, the Financial Markets Authority determined that the sale should have been disclosed in ANZ's financial statements.

=== RBNZ censuring ===
In May 2019, the Reserve Bank revoked ANZ's accreditation to model its own capital requirements due to "persistent failure in its control and attenuation process". Consequently ANZ is required to use a standardised model and to increase its minimum capital held by approximately 60% to $760 million. A Deloitte review found that "a historically complacent approach, the absence of a comprehensive compliance plan, diffused accountability and inadequate assurance processes, all contributed to the operational risk capital breach not being identified for more than five years". Although the RBNZ placed the responsibility on the directors, ANZ Chairman Sir John Key, maintains that the mistake was made by a junior employee.

=== Credit card repayment insurance ===
The Financial Markets Authority (FMA) accused ANZ NZ of issuing duplicate credit card repayment insurance policies to customers and failing to cancel policies for ineligible customers. The 390 customers with duplicate policies were still charged for the policies even though they provided no benefit. ANZ NZ acknowledged the bank took too long to report the issue to the FMA and attributed the issue to human error and systems issues. The bank has since issued an apology and compensation of NZD $440,000 to affected customers, however the bank still faces High Court proceedings from the FMA.

== Criticism ==
ANZ has often been a finalist for the Roger Awards, which recognise "The Worst Transnational Corporation[s] operating in New Zealand" and are run by CAFCA and GATT Watchdog. Reports released by CAFCA criticised ANZ NZ for:

- The highest gross interest margin in 2009 (after the 2008 financial crisis) out of the largest four banks operating in NZ (ANZ, Westpac, BNZ and ASB Bank). ANZ had a gross interest margin of 35.4% compared to Westpac (31%) and BNZ (30.3%).
- A high floating mortgage rate of 6.06% in 2009 compared to Westpac (5.69%) and BNZ (5.59%).

== See also ==
- List of banks
- List of banks in New Zealand
