= Dale v Trustbank Waikato Ltd =

New Zealand legal case

Dale v Trustbank Waikato ltd
- Court: High Court of New Zealand
- Full case name: Gladys Muriel Dale v Trustbank Waikato Limited
- Decided: 18 December 1992
- Transcript: http://www.nzlii.org/cgi-bin/sinodisp/nz/cases/NZHC/1992/853.html?query=dale%20waikato

Court membership
- Judge sitting: Penlington J

Keywords
- promissory estoppel, equitable estoppel

Dale v Trustbank Waikato Ltd is an often cited case in New Zealand cases regarding promissory estoppel, requiring that the promise must be unequivocal for this doctrine to be successful.

== Background ==
Mr and Mrs Dale jointly owned a house in Tokoroa. In 1987 they successfully refinanced their mortgage with Trustbank Waikato. As part of the mortgage application, Trustbank made it compulsory for them to have mortgage protection insurance, which would pay out the sum of $30,000 in the case of death of one of the parties.

The couple filled out the insurance application, but for unknown reasons, Mr Dale simply put a dash in the date of birth field. Trustbank however, already knew his date of birth, as it was correctly stated in the original mortgage application.

When Trustbank forwarded on the insurance application to the underwriters GRE insurance, they refused to offer any insurance cover, due to the fact that Mr Dale was aged 73, and they did not insure anyone over the age of 55.

Trustbank, now realising this mistake, should have informed the Dales that they had no insurance cover, and not debit their bank account for the monthly premiums. Unbelievably, Trustbank did neither, and even more unbelievably kept debiting the Dale's bank account the monthly premium until Mr Dale died on 19 August 1989.

Mrs Dale, now a widow, then made a claim with Trustbank for the insurance. Trustbank's response was that as GRE had not issued them with an insurance policy, there was no insurance cover, and so no insurance payout would be forthcoming.

Trustbank's Tokoroa manager also claimed at this time that he had verbally advised the Dales earlier that there was no insurance cover, and that the premiums continued to be debited due to a clerical error.

Not happy with this development, and undoubtedly aided by her son who was a solicitor, Mrs Dale filed legal proceedings for breach of contract, breaches of the Credit Contracts Act and the Fair Trading Act, and for promissory estoppel.

== Held ==
10 months after the hearing, the judge finally released his decision. The judge did not believe that the manager had told the Dales that they had no insurance cover, as under cross examination he could not state even when he told the Dales this, there was no note on file to support this conversation had happened, and he had also admitted that he did not even follow up this conversation in writing to the Dales. The judge also found it difficult to believe that the premiums continued to be debited in error, considering they were overdrawn at the time, and it was the banks policy for such accounts to be personally monitored by the branch manager.

Consequently, the judge ruled in favour of Mrs Dale for breach of contract. The judge also ruled, in case the matter was later successfully appealed, that the bank was also liable as well under promissory estoppel. On this Penlington J said

That to cure the underlying unconscionability, equity requires that the Dales’ expectation should be fulfilled. That expectation was mortgage repayment insurance, up to a sum of $30,000.
