= Polyfest =

Culture festival in New Zealand

Polyfest is an annual secondary school performing arts festival celebrating Polynesian culture held in Auckland, New Zealand. It was founded in Ōtara in 1976 and is now one of the largest Polynesian festivals in the world. The festival includes a performing arts competition between secondary school student while polyfest is also a second name for Pacifica

== Overview ==
The annual event is held in March. As of 2021, the festival takes place over four days with nearly 10,000 students participating. The principal sponsor, with naming rights, is ASB Bank. Polyfest also receives government financial support.

At the festival, the five main cultures of the Polynesian islands are each presented on their own stage. The cultures come from Niue, Samoa, Tonga, the Cook Islands and New Zealand (Māori). On the final day, the winners of each category will be chosen. A sixth stage is the Diversity stage, which hosts performances from China, Japan, Korea, India, Fiji and other cultures.

The Polynesian festival is significant for New Zealand's Pacific community. In addition to the performances, traditional meals and drinks are available. The festival promotes understanding of other cultures and gives students the opportunity to explore their culture.

== History ==
Polyfest was created against the backdrop in the early 1970s “explicit and populist racism” toward Pacific people and included the Dawn Raids, which targeted alleged illegal overstayers, predominantly those from Pacific nations. The South Auckland suburb of Ōtara, then part of Manukau City, had a large Māori and Pacific population with new housing estates with few opportunities for the people who live there.

Some inspired teachers and students including Ian Mitchell started a Polynesian Club (Poly Club) in 1976 at Hillary College which combined students, parents, and local organisations and the social, school, and sporting interests of young people. Michael Rollo was teaching kapa haka to the club and suggested a cultural festival, partly inspired by observations of cultural festivals in China. So later in 1976 the first Polyfest was staged between Sir Edmund Hillary Collegiate, Aorere College, Seddon College, and Māngere College in a bid to provide opportunities and to celebrate the community's diversity. In 1978, at the third Polyfest event, more than 20 schools participated.

Similar Polyfest events were created in other regions, including Canterbury and Otago, with Otago PolyFest celebrating 30 years in 2023.

In 2014 New Zealand Prime Minister John Key's government helped the festival secure funding for three years.

Polyfest was cancelled in 2019 due to the Christchurch mosque shootings and in 2020 due to the COVID-19 pandemic.

== See also ==
- Pasifika Festival, another festival celebrating Pacific cultures organised by Auckland Council
