= Sheep shagger =

Pejorative term for people of Welsh descent

Sheep shagger (also spelt sheepshagger or sheep-shagger) is a derogatory term, most often used to refer to Welsh people, implying that the subject has sex with sheep. In a court case in Wales, the use of the term directed at a Welsh person was ruled to be a "racially aggravating" factor in a disorderly conduct offence. It has been used in South Africa to refer to Australians and by Australians and New Zealanders to refer to one another.

== History ==
The use of the term sheep-shagger to refer to a Welsh person has arisen from the prevalence of sheep and sheep farming in Wales. It is often viewed as offensive in Wales, for the same reason as it is in South Africa to refer to Australians. In response to complaints over the use of phrase, in an Australian television advertisement for Toyota, the New Zealand Advertising Standards Authority determined the phrase was not viewed as offensive by the majority of New Zealanders.

=== Football ===
At football matches in England, supporters of Welsh teams as well as Welsh players are often called "sheep shaggers" in football chants from opposing fans. It is also used in Scotland to refer to supporters of Aberdeen. In 2001, Cardiff City signed English player Spencer Prior and jokingly included a contract clause that he would be obliged "to have a physical liaison with a sheep", in response to their fans being called sheep shaggers.

The name "Sheep Shaggers" has been used for at least two football fanzines – those for Bedford Town and for football in Western England.

=== Music ===
Manic Street Preachers frontman James Dean Bradfield routinely dealt with sheep-related heckles from gig audiences (including shouts of "sheep shagger", bleats and stuffed toy sheep thrown onstage) with the stock response "Yeah, we shag ‘em, then you eat ‘em!"

== Court case ==
In Prestatyn, the phrase was the subject of a 2013 court case, after Anthony Taaffe of Bolton, Greater Manchester, when staying at a holiday park in Gronant called an off-duty policeman and security staff "a bunch of sheep-shaggers". Taaffe asserted that the phrase was simply "a term for people living in the countryside", but pleaded guilty to racially aggravated disorderly behaviour and to a second, similar offence, when he called a police officer a "Welsh sheep shagger". He was fined £150.

== See also ==
- Buck (Kiwibank mascot)
- List of ethnic slurs by ethnicity
- Anđeli Babilona
