= TSB (New Zealand) =

Retail bank in New Zealand

- Type: Trustee bank
- Founded: 28 September 1850
- Headquarters: New Plymouth, New Zealand
- Key people: Kerry Boielle, CEO
- Products: Banking and financial services
- Rating: A− (Fitch; as of November 2024)
- Website: www.tsb.co.nz

TSB Bank Ltd (originally known as the Taranaki Savings Bank) trading as TSB, is a New Zealand bank with its headquarters in New Plymouth. It has 25 branches across the country but is heavily focused on the Taranaki region where 12 of its branches are located. As of June 2022, it was the seventh largest bank in New Zealand, with a market share in terms of assets of 1.4%.

It provides retail banking and related financial services to individuals and companies. It was originally one of twelve trustee banks in New Zealand, but when nine banks decided to amalgamate as Trust Bank, TSB Bank stood aside and remained an independent institution and has since expanded its business across the country. The bank is owned by the Toi Foundation (formerly the TSB Community Trust) which distributes the income it receives from the bank back into the New Zealand community.

TSB also operates TSB Foreign Exchange from 14 branches around the country.

== History ==
The New Plymouth Savings Bank was established in 1850 and received its first deposit on 28 September 1850 from Waitera te Karei with a deposit of £34. At the time the bank's accountant was paid an annual salary of £20, so the deposit was a considerable sum. Eight years later the bank fell under the auspices of the Savings Bank Act 1858 designed to regulate the savings bank market.

In 1921 a second branch was opened in Fitzroy, and a third in Waitara in 1946. In 1964 the first central Taranaki branch opened in Stratford, combined with a name change to Taranaki Savings Bank.

With the loosening of regulations on banking in the 1970s, the Bank's position was sufficiently sound for it to take maximum advantage of its new found freedom. In 1975, Taranaki Savings Bank was the first bank to offer free, interest-bearing cheque accounts and in 1981 the bank pioneered New Zealand's ATM Cashflow network with one ATM installed in each of the Hāwera, Fitzroy, New Plymouth City and New Plymouth City Centre (now TSB Centre) branches.

In 1984 and again in 1986 the bank rejected the branding adopted by the other eleven trustee banks across New Zealand, and in 1988 when the trustee banks were corporatised under the Trustee Banks Restructuring Act 1988 the bank stood aside from the merger into a single Trust Bank, remaining (along with ASB Bank Ltd and Westland Bank) fiercely independent. The savings bank was vested as a limited liability company (under the name Taranaki Savings Bank Limited) on 9 September 1988, nine days after the other 13 trustee banks were vested in their successor companies. In 1989 it changed its name to TSB Bank Ltd.

Old logo used until 2017

The Frankleigh Park branch was closed in 2012, the Merrilands branch on 25 July 2014, and the City branch in October 2014. The City branch building was 83 years old but assessed to be an earthquake risk. This building was the bank's former headquarters and still bore the old name "New Plymouth Savings Bank".

In addition to banking TSB Bank Ltd operated TSB Realty from about 1990, with three branches in Ōkato, Bell Block and New Plymouth. Bayleys Taranaki bought TSB Realty in October 2020.

In late August 2024, the Commerce Commission fined TSB Bank nearly NZ$2.5 million for overcharging customers about NZ$3.6 million through unreasonable credit and default fees between 2015 and 2021. TSB blamed system failures for the overcharging and said it had compensated affected customers.

On 30 September 2026, Heartland Group Shareholders voted to merge TSB with Heartland bank, this follows TSB's shareholder, the Toi Foundation voting in favour of the merger in August.

== Sponsorship ==
TSB Bank sponsors a number of organisations and has naming rights to many of them. Some of these include:

- TSB Bank Wallace Arts Centre, which opened in 2010 at Pah Homestead in Auckland. It houses the James Wallace Art Trust's collection of New Zealand art, which is valued at NZ$50 million.
- TSB Bank Festival of Lights
- TSB Bank New Zealand Surf Festival
- TSB Stadium
- TSB Showplace
- TSB Bank Arena

== Ownership ==
Ownership of TSB Bank remains vested in the Toi Foundation (formerly named TSB Community Trust,) with all profits staying in New Zealand. Toi Foundation is currently undergoing public consultation for feedback following a proposal to merge with Heartland Bank. On 25 August 2026, Kiwibank's parent Kiwi Group Capital Limited made a bid to purchase TSB. Commentators to described Kiwibank's bid as an "eleventh hour", which chairman David Mclean described as "... a superior proposal" and that Kiwibank would be the "better partner" for TSB. Heartland Group shareholders will vote by 30 September on their offer to buy TSB. The proposal was met with 94.8% of shareholders voting in favour of the merger.
