= Telecommunications Users Association of New Zealand =

The Telecommunications Users Association of New Zealand (TUANZ) represents corporate and individual end users of telecommunications in New Zealand. Its previous stated mission was to "...raise New Zealand into the OECD’s Top 10 countries in information and communications technologies with a special focus on communications...". The organisation is working on a new strategic direction and mission in 2015 under the direction of a new CEO.

Formed in 1985 by a consortium led by major computer suppliers, the not-for-profit organisation's activities include lobbying the government, working with the telecommunications industry, providing education courses and organising networking events in the major cities.

In 2010, the then chief executive, Ernie Newman, announced his retirement after the association's lobbying for government regulation of mobile termination rates was successful.

Paul Brislen was appointed CEO in February 2011. Brislen had been head of corporate communications at Vodafone New Zealand, and before that editor at Computerworld New Zealand. Paul resigned from the role in the first half of 2014 to take up a new position in Public Relations.

The new CEO is Craig Young, who was previously the Head of Industry Relations at Chorus. He started in the role on 13 October 2014.
