= Trust Bank (New Zealand) =

Bank in New Zealand

Trust Bank New Zealand Ltd
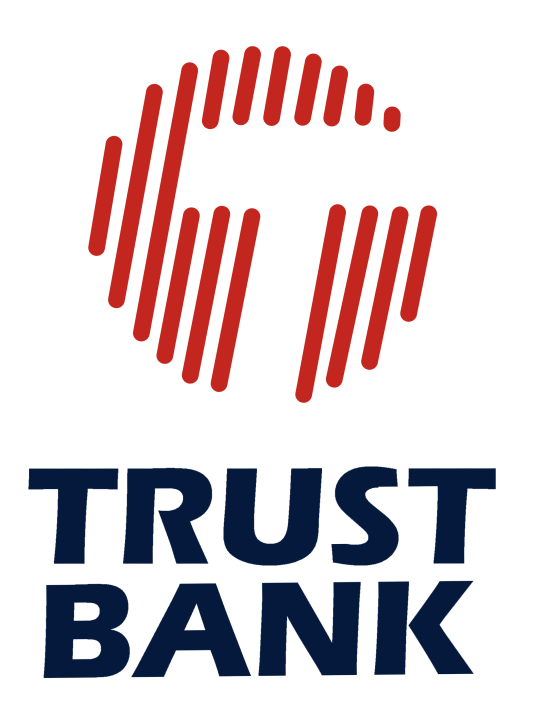
- Trust Bank New Zealand
- Trade name: Trust Bank
- Type: Trustee Bank
- Industry: Financial services
- Founded: 1988
- Defunct: 1996
- Fate: Acquired
- Successor: Westpac New Zealand
- Headquarters: Auckland, New Zealand
- Area served: New Zealand
- Services: Retail Banking

Trust Bank New Zealand Ltd was a registered bank that operated in New Zealand between 1986 and 1996. It was made up of (most of) the former regional savings banks that had their origins as far back as 1847.

Trust Bank was acquired by Westpac in 1996, who phased out the Trust Bank brand at the end of 2002, when the bank was rebranded from WestpacTrust to simply Westpac.

== Early history ==
Trust Bank New Zealand (TBNZ) had its origins in New Zealand's regional trustee savings banks. The five original banks were established under the Savings Bank Act 1858, and were:

- the Auckland Savings Bank (est. 1847)
- the New Plymouth Savings Bank (est. 1850)
- the Dunedin Savings Bank (est. 1864)
- the Invercargill Savings Bank (est. 1864)
- the Hokitika Savings Bank (est. 1866)

After the Second World War there was a huge increase in the number of regional trustee savings banks, with the following new banks opening:

- the Waikato Savings Bank (est. 1958)
- the Canterbury Savings Bank (est. 1962)
- the Hawke’s Bay Savings Bank (est. 1962)
- the Manawatu Wairarapa Savings Bank (est. 1963)
- the Bay of Plenty Savings Bank (est. 1964)
- the South Canterbury Savings Bank (est. 1964)
- the Wellington Savings Bank (est. 1964)
- the Wanganui Savings Bank (est. 19??)

Some of these banks merged early on (e.g. in 1973 the 'Manawatu Wairarapa Savings Bank' merged with what was by then the 'Hawke’s Bay & Gisborne Savings Bank' to form the 'Eastern & Central Savings Bank') and other renamed to reflect a change in focus (e.g. Dunedin Savings Bank became the Otago Savings Bank in 1964).

== Merger and dissolution ==
In 1984 the 12 regional banks took on a common name of 'Trustee Banks' - and changed their names to reflect this (e.g. 'Trustee Bank Southland'). The exception to this was the former New Plymouth Savings Bank that had changed its name to Taranaki Savings Bank and continues to trade under this name.

Less than two years later the network re-branded again as Trust Bank (e.g. 'Trust Bank Bay of Plenty'). Shortly after this ASB Trust Bank (who had also retained links to its former name of Auckland Savings Bank) withdrew from the Trust Bank group completely and began expanding as a commercial bank in its own right, simply called ASB Bank Ltd.

In 1988 all savings banks were corporatised under the Trustee Banks Restructuring Act 1988 hand ownership of each bank was vested in a regional community trust. At this stage Taranaki Savings Bank (who became TSB Bank Ltd) and Trustbank Westland (who renamed itself "Westland Bank") also left the group. The remaining 9 banks merged into one bank (Trust Bank New Zealand) although they continued to trade under their regional names. The community trusts remained as individual shareholders in the new organisation, with shares distributed as a percentage of shareholder funds.

Finally, in 1996 the community trusts sold Trust Bank New Zealand to Westpac for $1.2 billion. The two banks merged as WestpacTrust, although the word trust was phased out by 2002. From this time, ASB Bank (who had taken over Westland Bank) and TSB Bank became the only remaining "regional" banks.

== Community trusts ==
All of the community trusts still exist, although only one retains any shares in the bank that they were established from. Each community trust distributes money to the communities that they served within the boundaries of the former regional banks. The trusts are:

- Foundation North (formerly ASB Community Trust), former owner of ASB Bank Ltd / Auckland Savings Bank
- Trust Waikato, former owner of Trust Bank Waikato / Waikato Savings Bank
- BayTrust, former owner of Trust Bank Bay of Plenty / Bay of Plenty Savings Bank
- Toi Foundation (formerly TSB Community Trust), 100% owner of TSB Bank Ltd / Taranaki Savings Bank
- Whanganui Community Foundation, former owner of Trust Bank Central / Wanganui Savings Bank
- Eastern & Central Community Trust, former owner of Trust Bank Central / Eastern & Central Savings Bank
- Wellington Community Fund (formerly Wellington Community Trust), former owner of Trust Bank Wellington / Wellington Savings Bank
- Rātā Foundation (formerly The Canterbury Community Trust), former owner of Trust Bank Canterbury / Canterbury Savings Bank
- Community Trust Mid & South Canterbury, former owners of Trust Bank South Canterbury / South Canterbury Savings Bank
- West Coast Community Trust, former owners of Westland Bank Ltd / Westland Savings Bank
- Otago Community Trust, former owners of Trust Bank Otago / Otago Savings Bank
- Community Trust South (formerly Community Trust of Southland), former owner of Trust Bank Southland / Southland Savings Bank

== See also ==
- Dale v Trustbank Waikato Ltd
