= UDC Finance =

Financial services provider in New Zealand

UDC Finance Limited
- Type: Subsidiary
- Industry: Financial services
- Founded: 1938
- Founder: Otto Simon Heymann
- Headquarters: Auckland, New Zealand
- Key people: Don Atkinson (CEO)
- Services: Asset-backed finance
- Revenue: $137 million (2018)
- Net income: $65 million (2018)
- Number of employees: ~250
- Parent: SBI Shinsei Bank

UDC Finance Limited is a finance company in New Zealand. UDC's main expertise is now in providing asset-backed finance for plant, vehicles and equipment, where it does not rely on land or buildings as security. It is a subsidiary of SBI Shinsei Bank.

== History ==
UDC was founded in 1937 as Financial Services Limited by Otto Simon Heymann. In May 1938 Financial Services was the organiser and sponsor of the flotation of Todd Motors Corporation. Government policy of the day prohibited the issue of new banking licences so Financial Services obtained registration as a moneylender in August 1938 and began investing in hire purchase contracts with a special interest in New Zealand's secondary industry.

In order to establish international ties and better access to capital for New Zealand businesses London based banker United Dominions Trust was invited to purchase a shareholding. UDT took ownership of almost all Financial Services' capital in 1951. Financial Services was renamed United Dominions Corporation (South Pacific) Limited in 1954. On one of his pastoral visits UDT's founder convinced national representative rower Alexander Ross, deputy-Governor of the Reserve Bank of New Zealand, to join him in London where Ross later became chairman of UDT. In his 18 years in London Ross shifted UDT's activities so in the 1970s the majority of UDT profit came from banking and industrial finance.

This strategy to bring in foreign investment soon proved to have been a mistake. New Government regulations severely restricted expansion by foreign-owned companies. However the government partly relaxed its regulation of trading banks and finance houses in the 1960s allowing United Dominions Trust to sell 20% of its shares. UDC's own trading bankers, the Bank of New Zealand, did not take up the opportunity but elected to set up their own operation, BNZ Finance. The 20% shareholding was purchased by the ANZ Bank in 1965.

In 1970 UDC sold its 80% interest in by floating and listing the company on the New Zealand Exchange (NZX). ANZ became the major shareholder with 72%, taking full ownership in 1980 and delisting UDC from the NZX.

An affiliate of the HNA Group agreed to buy UDC in 2017. However the sale was not completed after the Overseas Investment Office refused to approve it, citing uncertainty over HNA's ownership structure. In March 2018 ANZ announced it was considering refloating UDC on the NZX, but later decided not to proceed with this.

In June 2020 SBI Shinsei Bank agreed terms to purchase UDC for NZ$762 million (US$480 million) making it Shinsei's biggest overseas acquisition to date. The sale was completed in September 2020.
