= Eastern & Central Savings Bank =

Former New Zealand bank

Eastern & Central Savings Bank was a savings bank that operated in New Zealand between 1972 and 1987. It was the result of a merger between two smaller regional savings banks; Hawke’s Bay and Gisborne Savings Bank and Manawatu Wairarapa Savings Bank. Fifteen years later it absorbed the customers of Trust Bank Wanganui to become Trust Bank Central.

Eastern & Central Savings Bank logo, as still displayed on their former branch in Broadway Avenue, Palmerston North

Timeline of Bank History

←	Absorbed Trust Bank Wanganui

←	Final takeover by Westpac

Hawkes Bay Savings Bank
Hawkes Bay & Gisborne Savings Bank
Manawatu Wairarapa Savings Bank
Eastern and Central Savings Bank
Eastern and Central Trustee Bank
Trust Bank Eastern and Central
Trust Bank Central
WestpacTrust
Westpac

Timeline of Eastern & Central Savings Bank's formation and disillusion.

== Early history ==
The origins of the bank began in 1962 when the Hawke’s Bay Savings Bank was first established. Two years later in 1964 the name was changed to the Hawke’s Bay and Gisborne Savings bank to better reflect the extent of the region it served. In 1963 a second bank was opened named the Manawatu Wairarapa Savings Bank, with a focus on the Manawatu, Horowhenua and Wairarapa districts.

These two banks merged with each other in 1973 to form a stronger bank in the district, named the Eastern & Central Savings Bank, with its main office in Hastings. It serves the east coast of the North Island from Poverty Bay to the Wairarapa ("Eastern"), plus the Manawatu and Horowhenua districts ("Central").

== Merger and dissolution ==
Eastern & Central Savings Bank was one of twelve regional savings banks located around the country established under the Savings Bank Act 1858. In 1984 group adopted a common branding as 'Trustee Bank', leading to a slight change in identity as 'Eastern & Central Trustee Bank'. Two years later and the brand changed again, this time to 'Trust Bank Eastern & Central'.

On 1 September 1988 all savings banks were corporatised under the Trustee Banks Restructuring Act 1988 and ownership of each bank was vested in a regional community trust. Shortly afterwards the majority of the trusts exchanged their shares in the regional banks for shares in Trust Bank New Zealand Ltd, who in turn took over the individual banks.

On the same day, under authorisation from the Finance Act 1988, Trust Bank Wanganui's operations were vested into that of Trust Bank Eastern & Central, to form simply 'Trust Bank Central'. This bank operated from Gisborne in the East to Masterton and Levin in the South and New Plymouth in the West (opening a branch on Devon Street in competition with TSB Bank Ltd who was not part of the merged Trust Bank). Oddly, the vestiges of Trust Bank Wanganui was renamed as Trust Bank Auckland Ltd and competed with ASB Bank Ltd who was no longer part of the Trust Bank alliance.

Finally, in 1996 the community trusts sold their remaining shares in Trust Bank New Zealand to Westpac Banking Corporation for $1.2 billion. The two banks merged as WestpacTrust, however the word 'Trust' was phased out by 2002.

== Eastern & Central Community Trust ==
As part of the restructure of the trustee savings banks in 1988, ownership of the bank was vested in the Eastern & Central Community Trust. The trust received profits from the bank and distributed them to community organisations within the banks boundaries. In 1996 Westpac completed its takeover of Trust Bank New Zealand Ltd (which included Trust Bank Central) and the proceeds from the sale were invested in a wider portfolio of investment products, mostly cash, bonds and property within New Zealand & Australia.
