= The Co-operative Bank (New Zealand) =

New Zealand cooperative bank

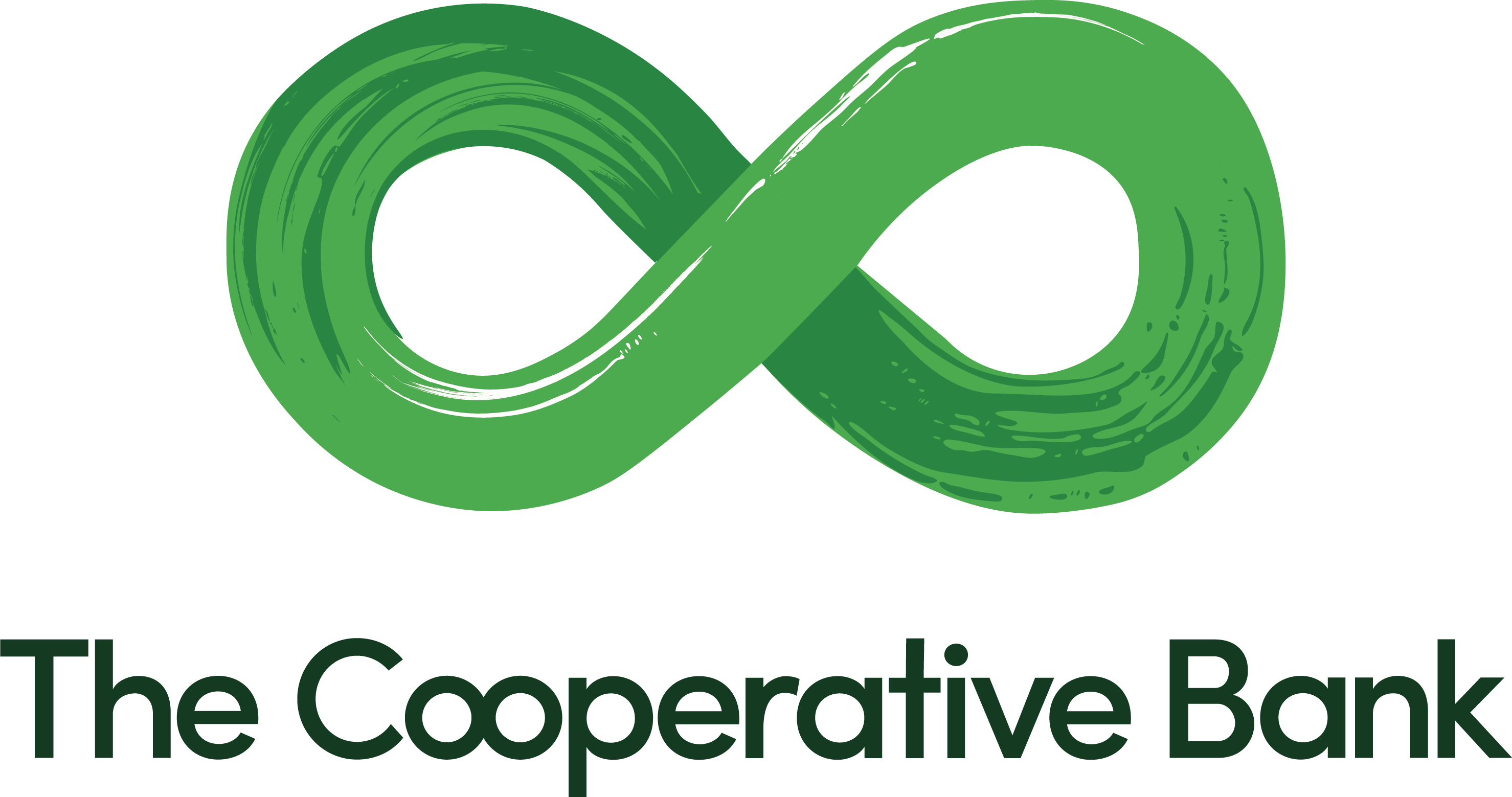

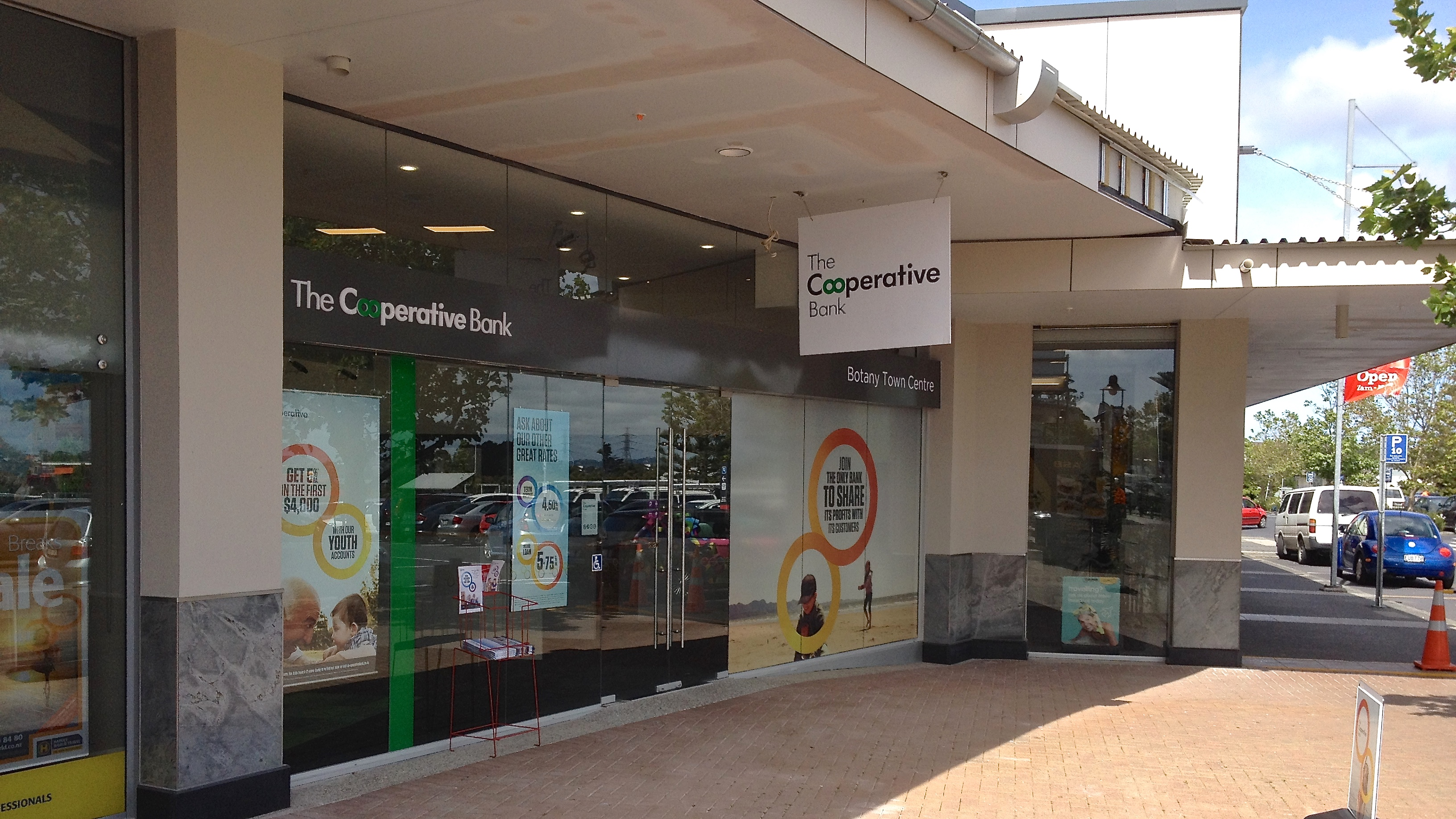
- Botany town centre branch - Auckland in 2014
- Formerly: Public Service Investment Society (PSIS)
- Type: Cooperative
- Industry: Banking
- Founded: 1928
- Headquarters: Wellington, New Zealand
- Number of locations: 26
- Area served: New Zealand
- Key people: Mark Wilkshire (CEO), Sarah Haydon (Chair)
- Services: Investments, Loans, Insurance, Bank Accounts
- Total assets: NZ$3.3305 billion (2022)
- Owner: Customers (161,000 in 2017)
- Number of employees: 360
- Rating: BBB (Fitch, June 2023)
- Website: www.co-operativebank.co.nz

The Co-operative Bank is a New Zealand based and registered bank. It provides everyday banking, deposits, savings, loans, insurance and small-business banking throughout the country.

Originally set up in 1928 as the Public Service Investment Society and subsequently renamed PSIS, the Co-operative Bank became a registered bank in October 2011. As of 2017 the bank has around 161,000 customers throughout New Zealand. As a co-operative the Bank is owned by its customers and its main purpose is to benefit the customers.

== History ==
The Co-operative Bank was founded in 1928 as the Public Service Investment Society (PSIS), lending money to public servants when others were reluctant to do so On 28 June 1979, the PSIS was placed into statutory management, which ended in October 1987.

In 1993, the bank was registered under the Companies Act 1993. In 1996, the PSIS was registered under the Co-operative Companies Act 1996. On 27 November 2002, the bank's chief executive John Price resigned. On 14 March 2003, Girol Karacaoglu was appointed as the PSIS's chief executive. By May 2006, the bank's total assets had surpassed NZ$1 billion.

In June 2011, the PSIS announces that its divided would be paid. In October 2011, the PSIS changed its name to The Co-operative Bank and was registered as a bank by the Reserve Bank of New Zealand. In January 2012, chief executive Karacaoglu and chairman Sir David Gascoigne retired. They were succeeded by chairman Steve Fyfe and Bruce Mclachlan later in the year.

By 2013, The Co-Operative Bank had paid back over $12 million to its members. In November 2014, the Co-Operative Bank opened a branch in Queen Street, Auckland, with Frans Kruger becoming its first branch Manager. In 2017, the chief executive Bruce McLachlan resigned. Chief financial officer Gareth Fleming served as acting chief executive until David Cunningham was appointed as CEO in May 2017. By July 2019, the bank had repaid $2.1 million of surplus profit back to its customers.

In early April 2026, The Co-Operative Bank was fined NZ$2.48 million by the High Court for charging 48,249 customers about NZ$7.2 million in "unreasonable fees" across a range of products.

== Organisational memberships ==
- Cooperative Business New Zealand (Inc)
- New Zealand Financial Services Federation (Inc)
- New Zealand Savings Institutions Association
