= Westland Savings Bank =

Former New Zealand bank

Westland Savings Bank was one of 14 regional trustee savings banks operating in New Zealand. WSB was based on the West Coast of the South Island of New Zealand.

== History ==
The bank was established in November 1866 under the name Hokitika Savings Bank during the West Coast Gold Rush under special banking legislation that separated savings banks from trading banks.

The bank operated for the good of its users and was touted as a 'preventative to squandering'. In exchange for an exclusive regional franchise the bank received a government guarantee against default (Killerby & Smith, 2001). The guarantee was in the form of a guarantee of the savings bank overdraft at the Bank of New Zealand. Trustees of the bank were government appointed.

Like the other New Zealand trustee savings banks, in 1987 the bank was corporatised, became a registered bank and the shareholding vested in a local community trust. The category of savings bank being abolished in 1987.

For a period the bank was known as Trust Bank Westland after the individual savings banks that operated across the country created a network known as Trust Bank. Trust Bank Westland withdrew from the Trust Bank Alliance and became simply 'Westland Bank'. However it was quickly purchased by ASB Bank as the latter sought to expand and the brand disappeared from the West Coast.

The branch in Westport operated from 1965 until 1994 when it became part of ASB and is still in operation at the same location.

Like all of the savings banks and the Post Office Savings Bank Westland Savings banks operated passbook bank accounts and school banking programmes that involved students making regular deposits through schools. Westland Savings Bank's accounts were known as a "HIT Account" – HIT standing for "High Interest Trustee".

== Branches ==
- Greymouth
- Reefton
- Murchison
- Hokitika
- Nelson
- Westport

== Hokitika Office ==
The former Hokitika branch and head office building has been preserved and is registered as a category 2 historic place by Heritage New Zealand.
