= ASB Bank =

Bank in New Zealand

ASB Bank Limited
- Type: Subsidiary
- Industry: Banking; Financial services Investment services
- Founded: 5 June 1847; 179 years ago (as Auckland Savings Bank)
- Headquarters: Auckland, New Zealand
- Area served: New Zealand
- Key people: Vittoria Shortt, CEO
- Products: Finance and insurance; Consumer banking; Corporate banking; Investment banking; Investment management; Mortgages; Credit cards
- Revenue: ▲NZ$1.607 billion (2011)
- Operating income: ▼$3,393,000,000 New Zealand dollars (2024)
- Total assets: ▲NZ$63.5 billion (2012)
- Number of employees: 4907 (2018)
- Parent: Commonwealth Bank of Australia
- Subsidiaries: BankDirect
- Website: www.asb.co.nz

ASB Bank Limited, commonly stylised as ASB, is a bank owned by Commonwealth Bank of Australia, operating in New Zealand. It provides a range of financial services including retail, business and rural banking, funds management, insurance, and investment and securities services through its ASB Group Investments and ASB Securities divisions. ASB also operated BankDirect, a branchless banking service that provided service via phone, online, EFTPOS and ATMs only.

== History ==
ASB was established in 1847 as the Auckland Savings Bank. The first meeting was held in the store of Campbell and Brown, and was attended by John Logan Campbell, Dr John Johnson, Rev Thomas Buddle, John Jermyn Symonds, John MacDougall, David Graham (a brother of Robert Graham), Robert Appleyard Fitzgerald, Thomas Forsaith, John Israel Montefiore, James Dilworth, Alexander Kennedy, and William Smellie Graham.

During the 1980s the association of savings banks amalgamated the local savings banks throughout New Zealand with ASB at their head, and adopted the name, ASB Trust Bank. In 1986, ASB withdrew from the Trust Bank and in 1987 became a full-fledged commercial bank under the name, ASB Bank. In 1988, the Government passed the Trustee Banks Restructuring Act, which enabled ASB to become a public company. In 1989, the owner of the bank, ASB Community Trust, sold 75% of the shares to Commonwealth Bank. In 1994, ASB purchased and amalgamated Westland Bank, another former savings bank, located on the South Island's west coast, which enabled it to operate on a truly national basis.

In 1999, ASB Group acquired Sovereign Limited, a life insurance company, and the retail stockbroking and fixed income operations of Warburg Dillon Read. In September 2017, ASB's parent, the Commonwealth Bank agreed to sell Sovereign to AIA Group, and the sale was completed on 2 July 2018, with the Sovereign brand continuing until 5 August 2019.

In 2000, Commonwealth Bank bought the remaining 25% of ASB's shares from the Trust. In 2005 the bank changed the ASB Bank brand to ASB to reflect the more integrated financial services provider that it had become.

In early July 2020, ASB announced that it would be closing nine branches while 25 branches would be moving to three day weeks due to a shift in demand for online services. The company will also hire 150 additional staff to provide specialist online support. In early October 2025, ASB Bank agreed to pay NZ$135.6 million to settle a lawsuit relating to alleged breaches of the Credit Contracts and Consumer Finance Act.

== Innovation ==
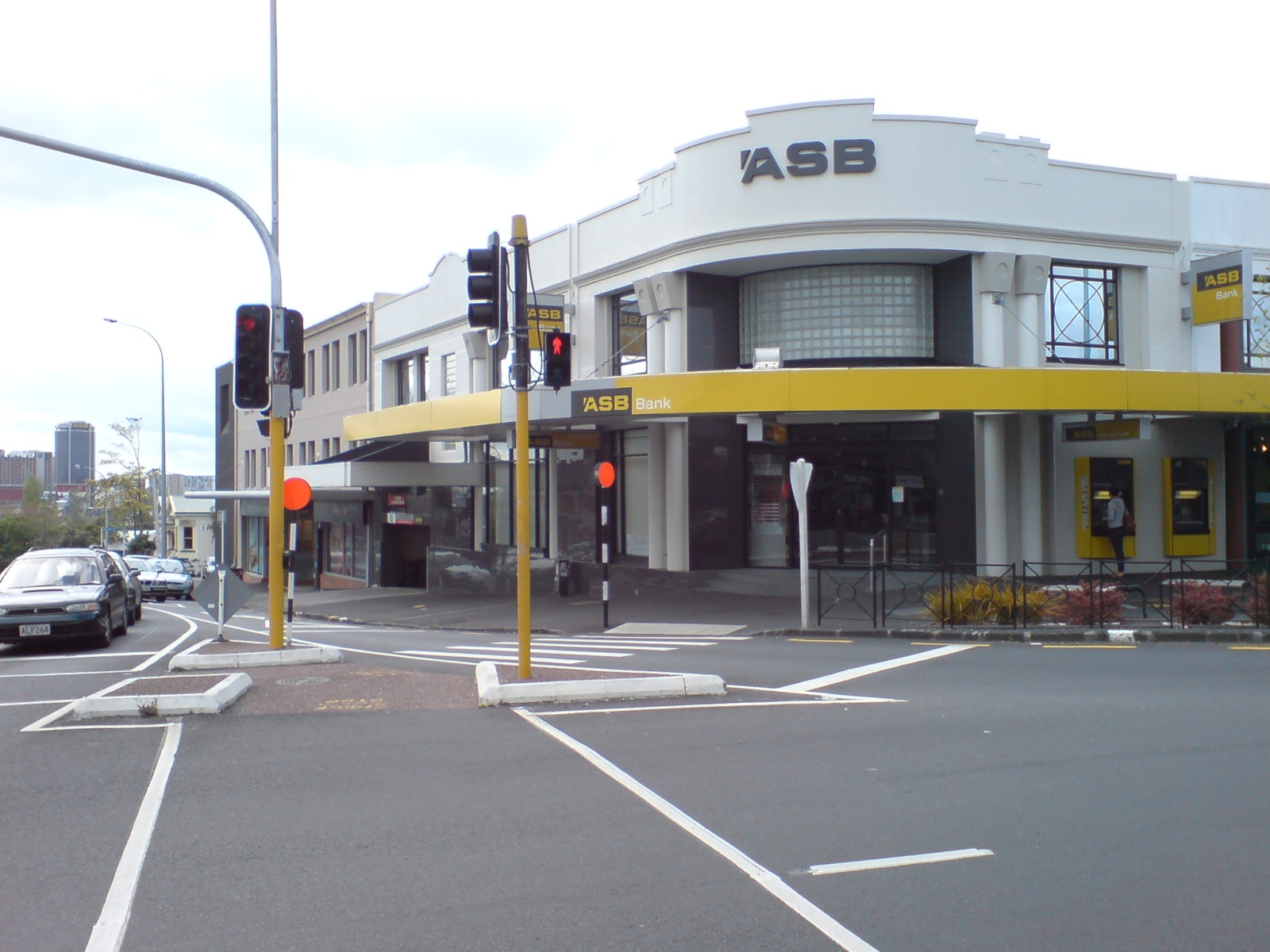
A branch in Ponsonby, Auckland

The bank has won awards including NetGuide Award for best financial services site in 2006 and 2007, TUANZ Innovation Award for Financial Service in 2001, 2002, 2003 and 2005, and Canstar's inaugural annual Best Online Banking Award in 2012.

ASB launched pago in November 2006, which is an electronic payment service that allows anyone with a New Zealand bank account to send cleared funds via mobile phone or the internet to another person or participating retailer in real-time. The technology has not succeeded in the way ASB hoped, with very little use and virtually no significant updates since 2010. ASB Securities, launched in 1999, remains the largest online broker in New Zealand in terms of trading volume and active customers.

The bank has found significant success by being the first to introduce innovative services and features to the New Zealand market. ASB was the first bank in New Zealand to offer:

- internet banking (FastNet Classic in 1997)
- branches open seven days a week (1998)
- online share trading on both the Australian and New Zealand share-markets (via ASB Securities in 1999)
- banking via mobile phones (ASB Mobile in 1999)
- the ability for customers to stop receiving their paper statements (2003)
- banking via PDAs and browser-based mobile banking (2006)
- automatic rounding of transactions where the difference is put into a savings account (Save the Change in 2010)
- Facebook friend payments via ASB Mobile iOS, Android and Windows Phone apps (2012)
- a dedicated real estate app for iOS (ASB Property Guide in 2012)

== Advertising and sponsorship ==
Previous ASB logo

Previous ASB logo

ASB has become known for using well-known characters in its advertising. The bank had a series of highly successful, award-winning commercials with the Ira Goldstein character (played by American actor Steve Mellor), a bumbling American banker sent to New Zealand to find out "what makes that bank different". The ads were popular over an 11-year period. However, the campaign ended in 2010 as the bank moved to a new advertising agency from TBWA/Whybin.

In October 2011 the bank introduced the Experience ASB campaign with new advertising agency Droga5. The campaign featured voice overs by English actor Dame Judi Dench and allowed potential customers to "test drive" the bank before joining.

In July 2012 ASB left Droga5 for Saatchi & Saatchi. In February 2013 ASB launched a new advertising campaign featuring Brian Blessed playing a fictionalised version of himself encouraging New Zealanders to be proud of their achievements whether big or small.

The bank also supports the ASB Community Trust, which was formed in 1988 with an endowment from the sale of ASB to Australia's Commonwealth Bank. The Trust has distributed more than $745 million since 1988, mostly giving grants to the arts, sport, recreation, environment, heritage, health and social services areas, as well as funding capital projects in local communities around New Zealand.

ASB is the corporate sponsor and partner for a number of high-profile New Zealand organisations and events such as:

- Hato Hone St John New Zealand
- Youthline
- New Zealand Red Cross
- ASB Classic
- Black Ferns, All Blacks and Rugby Aupiki
- ASB Polyfest - A four-day event in Auckland featuring over 9,000 student performers celebrating the culture of the Pacific and attracting an audience of over 90,000.
- Cyber Skills Aotearoa
- Springboard Trust
- New Zealand Falcons

The bank is also a major sponsor of several event venues in New Zealand:

- ASB Tennis Centre
- ASB Theatre Marlborough
- ASB Auckland Waterfront Theatre
- ASB Atrium and ASB Careers Centre at the University of Auckland's Owen G. Glenn Building, home of the university's Business School.

== See also ==
- List of banks
- List of banks in New Zealand
- Sovereign – New Zealand life and health insurer
- Commonwealth Bank – Australian multinational bank
- ASB Classic
- ASB Premiership
