= History of New Zealand =

The human history of New Zealand can be dated back to between 1320 and 1350 CE, when the main settlement period started, after it was discovered and settled by Polynesians, who developed a distinct Māori culture. Like other Pacific cultures, Māori society was centred on kinship links and connection with the land but, unlike them, it was adapted to a cool, temperate environment rather than a warm, tropical one. The first European explorer known to have visited New Zealand was the Dutch navigator Abel Tasman, on 13 December 1642. In 1643 he charted the west coast of the North Island, his expedition then sailed back to Batavia without setting foot on New Zealand soil. British explorer James Cook, who reached New Zealand in October 1769 on the first of his three voyages, was the first European to circumnavigate and map New Zealand. From the late 18th century, the country was regularly visited by explorers and other sailors, missionaries, traders and adventurers. The period from Polynesian settlement to Cook's arrival is New Zealand's prehistoric period, a time before written records began. Acknowledgement of indigenous oral history as recorded history is a matter of academic debate. Depending on definitions, the period from 1642 to 1769 can be called New Zealand's protohistory rather than prehistory: Tasman's recording of Māori was isolated and scant.

On 6 February 1840, the Treaty of Waitangi was signed between representatives of the United Kingdom and various Māori chiefs, initially at Waitangi and over the following weeks at other locations across the country. On 21 May 1840, New Zealand entered the British Empire when Lieutenant-Governor William Hobson proclaimed British sovereignty at Kororāreka (Russell). Disputes over the differing versions of the Treaty and settler desire to acquire land from Māori led to the New Zealand Wars from 1843. There was extensive British settlement throughout the rest of the 19th century and into the early part of the next century. The effects of European infectious diseases, the New Zealand Wars, and the imposition of a European economic and legal system led to most of New Zealand's land passing from Māori to Pākehā (European) ownership, and Māori became impoverished.

The colony gained responsible government in the 1850s. From the 1890s the New Zealand Parliament enacted a number of progressive initiatives, including women's suffrage and old age pensions. After becoming a self-governing Dominion with the British Empire in 1907, the country remained an enthusiastic member of the empire, and over 100,000 New Zealanders fought in World War I as part of the New Zealand Expeditionary Force. After the war, New Zealand signed the Treaty of Versailles (1919), joined the League of Nations, and pursued an independent foreign policy, while its defence was still controlled by Britain. When World War II broke out in 1939, New Zealand contributed to the defence of Britain and the Pacific War; the country contributed some 120,000 troops. From the 1930s the economy was highly regulated and an extensive welfare state was developed. From the 1950s Māori began moving to the cities in large numbers, and Māori culture underwent a renaissance. This led to the development of a Māori protest movement, which in turn led to greater recognition of the Treaty of Waitangi in the late 20th century.

The country's economy suffered in the aftermath of the 1973 global energy crisis, the loss of New Zealand's biggest export market upon Britain's entry to the European Economic Community, and rampant inflation. In 1984, the Fourth Labour Government was elected amid a constitutional and economic crisis. The interventionist policies of the Third National Government were replaced by Rogernomics, a commitment to a free-market economy. Foreign policy after 1984 became more independent, especially in pushing for a nuclear-free zone. Subsequent governments have generally maintained these policies, although tempering the free market ethos somewhat.

== Polynesian settlement and development of Māori culture ==
The Māori are most likely descended from people who migrated from Taiwan to Melanesia and then travelled east through to the Society Islands. After a pause of 70 to 265 years, a new wave of exploration led to the discovery and settlement of New Zealand.

New Zealand was first settled by eastern Polynesians, who in time developed a distinct Māori culture. Linguistic and archaeological evidence suggests that humans migrated from Taiwan via southeast Asia to Melanesia and then radiated eastwards into the Pacific in pulses and waves of discovery. They gradually colonised islands from Samoa and Tonga to the eastern Polynesian islands of Hawaii, the Marquesas, Easter Island, the Society Islands and, finally, New Zealand. According to oral tradition, the heroic explorer Kupe was the first discoverer of New Zealand. In an early European synthesised interpretation of these accounts, he discovered New Zealand around 750 CE and a single great fleet of settlers set out from Hawaiki in eastern Polynesia around 1350. However, from the late 20th century, this synthesis has been increasingly relegated to the realm of myth. This is further complicated by the way in which Polynesian genealogies combine lineages from multiple sides of a person's family which causes the genealogy to appear longer, and therefore older, than it really is and an alternative view has emerged from fresh archaeological and scientific evidence.

Regarding the arrival date of the settlers, there are no human remains, artefacts or structures confidently dated to earlier than the Kaharoa Tephra, a layer of volcanic debris deposited by the Mount Tarawera eruption around 1314 CE. Radiocarbon dating and pollen evidence of widespread forest fires shortly before the eruption might also indicate a pre-eruption human presence. The 1999 dating of some kiore (Polynesian rat) bones to as early as 100 CE was later found to be an error; new samples of rat bone (and also of rat-gnawed shells and woody seed cases) mostly gave dates later than the Tarawera eruption with only three samples giving slightly earlier dates. Additionally, mitochondrial DNA variability within the Māori populations suggest that Polynesians first settled the New Zealand archipelago between 1250 and 1300. Therefore, current opinion is that, whether or not some settlers arrived before 1314, the main settlement period was in the subsequent decades, possibly involving a coordinated mass migration. This scenario is consistent with a much debated third line of oral evidence, traditional genealogies (whakapapa) that point to around 1350 as a probable arrival date for many of the founding canoes (waka).

It is the broad consensus of prehistorians that the Polynesian settlement of mainland New Zealand was planned and deliberate. Further, there is no evidence of a pre‑Polynesian people in New Zealand. New Zealand has no native land mammals (apart from some rare bats), so birds, fish and sea mammals were important sources of protein for the settlers. They quickly exploited the abundant large game, such as moa – large flightless ratites – which were pushed to extinction by about 1500. They cleared approximately 40% of New Zealand's original forest cover, especially in the North Island, practicing slash-and-burn agriculture. They cultivated food plants that they had brought from eastern Polynesia, including sweet potatoes (called kūmara), taro, gourds, and yams. They also cultivated and harvested the cabbage tree, a plant endemic to New Zealand, and exploited wild foods such as bracken fernroot.

A group of New Zealand Polynesians migrated from mainland New Zealand to the Chatham Islands, to the east of the main archipelago, probably in about the 15th century, where their culture evolved into the distinct Moriori culture.

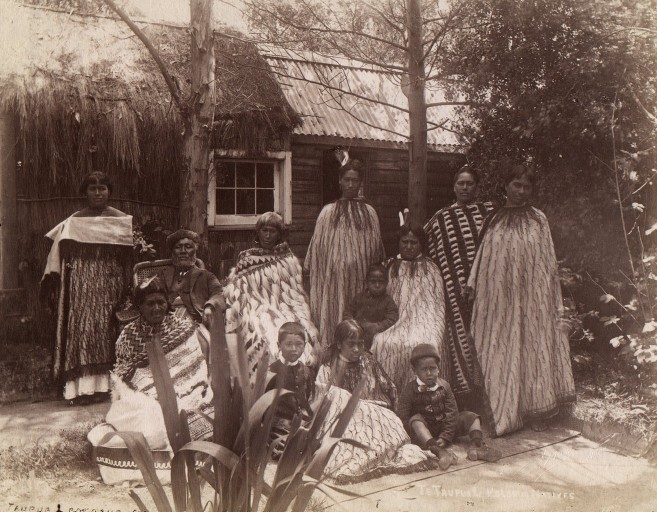
Māori whānau (extended family) from Rotorua in the 1880s. Many aspects of Western life and culture, including European clothing and architecture, were incorporated into Māori society during the 19th century.

Culture changed on the mainland as moa and other large game became scarce or extinct, evolving into that now known as Māori (sometimes called Classic Māori by prehistorians). There were regional differences due to climate. In areas where it was possible to grow taro and kūmara, horticulture became more important. This was not possible in the south of the South Island, but wild plants such as fernroot were often available and cabbage trees were cultivated. Warfare increased in importance, reflecting increased competition for land and other resources, and fortified pā became more common. There is debate though about the actual frequency of warfare. As elsewhere in the Pacific, cannibalism was part of warfare.

Leadership was based on a system of chieftainship, which was often but not always hereditary, with chiefs (male or female) needing to demonstrate leadership abilities to avoid being superseded by more dynamic individuals. The most important units of pre-European Māori society were the whānau or extended family, and the hapū or group of whānau. After these came the iwi or tribe, consisting of groups of hapū. Related hapū would often trade goods and co-operate on major projects, but conflict between hapū was also relatively common. Traditional Māori society preserved history orally through narratives, songs, and chants; skilled experts could recite the tribal genealogies (whakapapa) back for hundreds of years. Arts included whaikōrero (oratory), song composition in multiple genres, dance forms including haka, as well as weaving, highly developed wood carving, and tā moko (tattoo).

== Early contact periods ==
=== Early European exploration ===
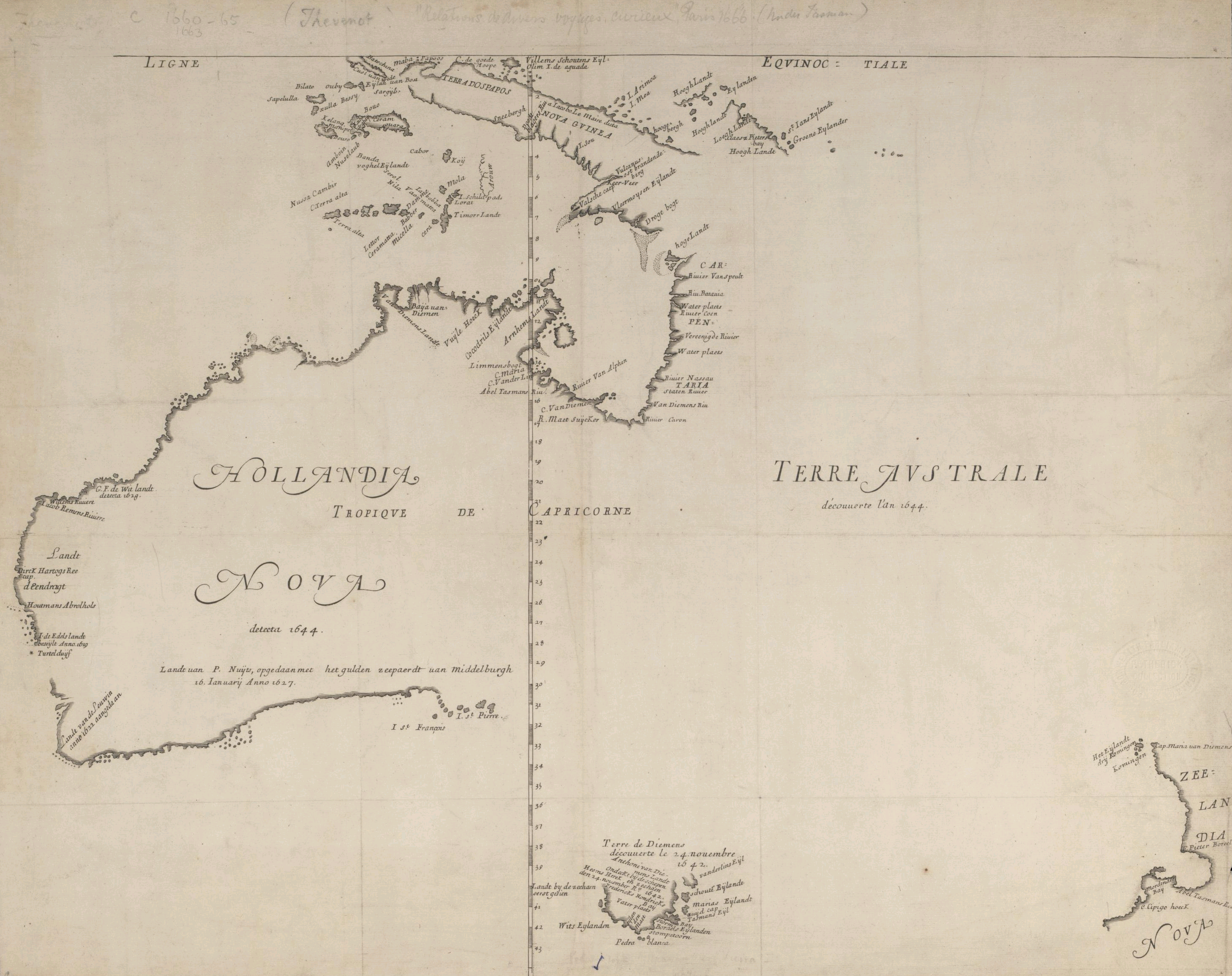
An early map of Australasia during the Golden Age of Dutch exploration and discovery (c. 1590s – c. 1720s). Based on a chart by Joan Blaeu, c. 1644.

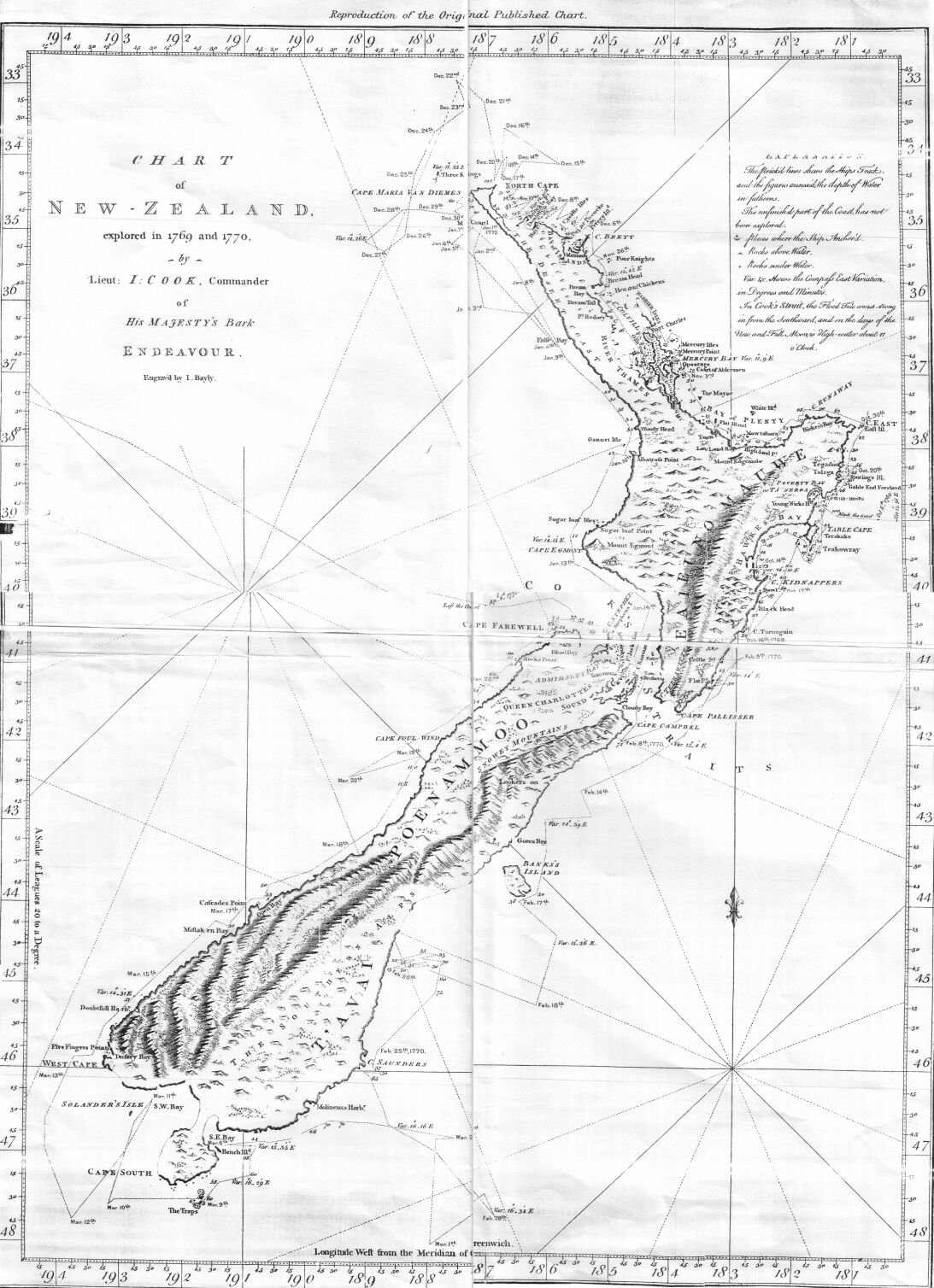
Map of the New Zealand coastline as Cook charted it on his first visit in 1769–70. The track of the Endeavour is also shown.

The first Europeans known to have reached New Zealand were the crew of Dutch explorer Abel Tasman who arrived in his ships Heemskerck and Zeehaen. Tasman anchored at the northern end of the South Island in Golden Bay (he named it Murderers' Bay) in December 1642, and sailed northward to Tonga following an attack by local Māori, Ngāti Tūmatakōkiri. Tasman sketched sections of the two main islands' west coasts. Tasman called them Staten Landt, after the States General of the Netherlands, and that name appeared on his first maps of the country. In 1645 Dutch cartographers changed the name to Nova Zeelandia in Latin, from Nieuw Zeeland, after the Dutch province of Zeeland.

Over 100 years elapsed before Europeans returned to New Zealand; in 1769, British naval captain James Cook of HM Bark Endeavour visited New Zealand, and coincidentally, only two months later, Frenchman Jean-François de Surville, in command of his own expedition, reached the country. When Cook left on his first voyage, the sealed orders given to him by the British Admiralty ordered him to proceed "...to the Westward between the Latitude beforementioned and the Latitude of 35° until' you discover it, or fall in with the Eastern side of the Land discover'd by Tasman and now called New Zeland." He would return to New Zealand on both of his subsequent voyages of discovery.

Various claims have been made that New Zealand was reached by other non-Polynesian voyagers before Tasman, but these are not widely accepted. Peter Trickett, for example, argues in Beyond Capricorn that the Portuguese explorer Cristóvão de Mendonça reached New Zealand in the 1520s, and the Tamil bell discovered by missionary William Colenso has given rise to a number of theories, but historians generally believe the bell "is not in itself proof of early Tamil contact with New Zealand". A 2014 article claimed to have found a Dutch shipwreck that post-dated Tasman's arrival. The claim was dismissed due to flawed methodology.

From the 1790s, the waters around New Zealand were visited by British, French and American whaling, sealing and trading ships. Their crews traded European goods, including guns and metal tools, for Māori food, water, wood, flax and sex. Māori were reputed to be enthusiastic and canny traders, even though the levels of technology, institutions and property rights differed greatly from the standards in European societies. Although there were some conflicts, such as the killing of French explorer Marc-Joseph Marion du Fresne in 1772 and the destruction of the Boyd in 1809, most contact between Māori and Europeans was peaceful.

=== Early European settlement ===
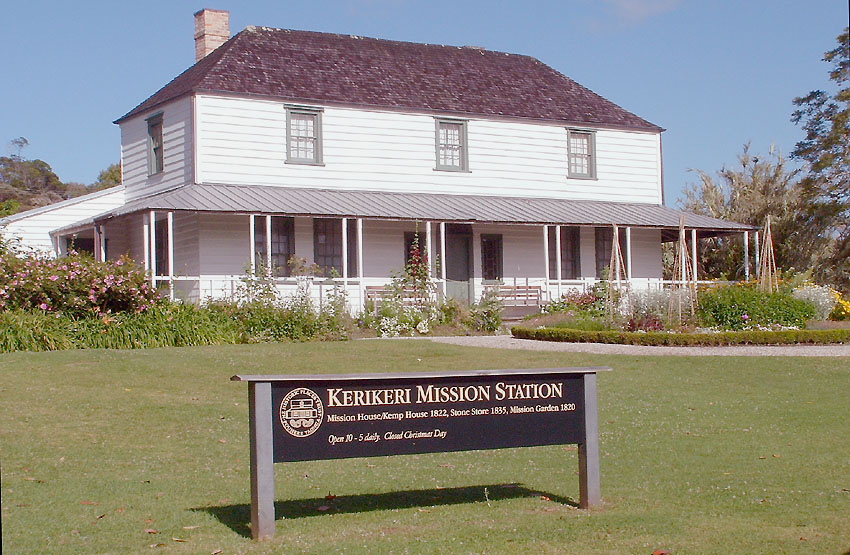
The Mission House at Kerikeri, completed in 1822, is New Zealand's oldest surviving building.

Pākehā settlement increased through the early decades of the 19th century, with numerous trading stations established, especially in the North Island. Christianity was introduced to New Zealand in 1814 by Samuel Marsden, who travelled to the Bay of Islands where he founded a mission station on behalf of the Church of England's Church Missionary Society. By 1840 over 20 stations had been established. From missionaries, the Māori learnt not just about Christianity but also about European farming practices and trades, and how to read and write. Building on the work of the Church Missionary Society missionary Thomas Kendall, beginning in 1820, linguist Samuel Lee worked with Māori chief Hongi Hika to transcribe the Māori language into written form. In 1835 the country's first successful printing was two books from the Bible produced by Church Missionary Society printer William Colenso, translated into Māori by the Rev. William Williams.

The first European missionary settlement was at Rangihoua Bay, the land purchased on 24 February 1815, where the first full-blooded European infant in the territory, Thomas Holloway King, was born on 21 February 1815 at the Oihi Mission Station near Hohi Bay in the Bay of Islands. Kerikeri, founded in 1822, and Bluff founded in 1823, both claim to be the oldest European settlements in New Zealand. Many European settlers bought land from Māori, but misunderstanding and different concepts of land ownership led to conflict and bitterness.

=== Māori response ===
The effect of contact on Māori varied. In some inland areas life went on more or less unchanged, although a European metal tool such as a fish-hook or hand axe might be acquired through trade with other tribes. At the other end of the scale, tribes that frequently encountered Europeans, such as Ngāpuhi in Northland, underwent major changes.

Pre-European Māori had no distance weapons except for tao (spears) and the introduction of the musket had an enormous effect on Māori warfare. Tribes with muskets would attack tribes without them, killing or enslaving many. As a result, guns became very valuable and Māori would trade huge quantities of goods for a single musket. From 1805 to 1843 the Musket Wars raged until a new balance of power was achieved after most tribes had acquired muskets. In 1835, the Moriori of the Chatham Islands were attacked, enslaved, and nearly exterminated by mainland Ngāti Mutunga and Ngāti Tama Māori. In the 1901 census, only 35 Moriori were recorded. Tommy Solomon, the last full-blooded Moriori, died in 1933.

Around this time, many Māori converted to Christianity. In 1845, 64,000 Māori were attending church services, over half of the estimated population of 110,000. By then, there was probably a higher proportion of Māori attending Church in New Zealand than British people in the United Kingdom, and their moral practices and spiritual lives were transformed. The New Zealand Anglican Church, te Hāhi Mihinare (the missionary church), was, and is, the largest Māori denomination. Māori made Christianity their own and spread it throughout the country often before European missionaries arrived.

=== Māori Declaration of Independence ===
In response to complaints from missionaries, and to a petition from Māori chiefs calling for King William IV to be a "friend and guardian" of New Zealand, in the context of there being lawless sailors and adventurers in New Zealand, the British Government appointed James Busby as British Resident in 1832. A British Resident is a position with limited authority, and no power to make or enforce any law. In 1834 Busby encouraged Māori chiefs from the northern part of the North Island to assert what he called their sovereignty by signing the Declaration of the Independence of New Zealand (He Whakaputanga), in 1835, that Busby had written. It asserted that sovereign power and authority in the land ('Ko te Kingitanga ko te mana i te w[h]enua') resided with the Confederation of United Tribes (Te Whakaminenga), and that no foreigners could make laws. The Confederation was to meet at Waitangi each autumn to frame laws, and in return for the chiefs' protection of British subjects in their territory they sought King William's protection against threats to their mana. They also thanked the King for acknowledging their flag.

The declaration was sent to King William IV and was recognised by Britain. Busby was provided with neither legal authority nor military support and was thus ineffective in controlling the Pākehā population.

=== Treaty of Waitangi ===
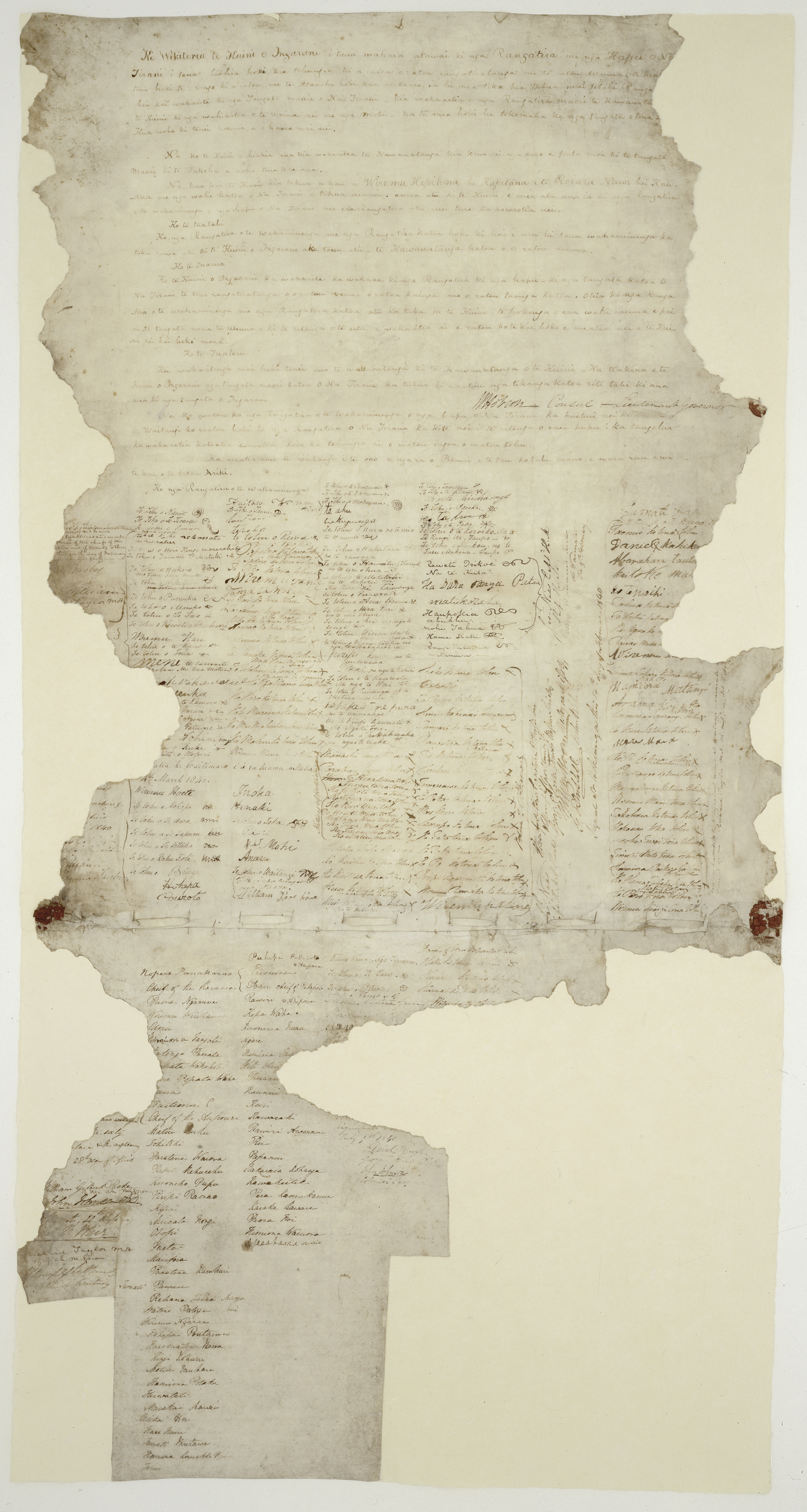
One of the few extant copies of the Treaty of Waitangi

In 1839, the New Zealand Company announced plans to buy large tracts of land and to colonise New Zealand. This and the increased commercial interests of merchants in Sydney and London spurred the British Government to take stronger action. The Government sent Captain William Hobson to New Zealand to be lieutenant governor. In reaction to the New Zealand Company's moves, on 15 June 1839 the issue of new Letters Patent expanded the territory of New South Wales to include all of New Zealand. Governor of New South Wales George Gipps was appointed governor over New Zealand.

On 6 February 1840, Hobson and about forty Māori chiefs signed the Treaty of Waitangi at Waitangi in the Bay of Islands. The British subsequently took copies of the Treaty around the islands of New Zealand for signature by other chiefs. A significant number refused to sign or were not asked but, in total, more than five hundred Māori eventually signed.

Two versions of the treaty were signed, one in English, the other in Māori. The meaning of each version is not the same which has led to various interpretations (see interpretations of the Treaty). Since 1940, issues relating to the treaty have played an increasingly active social and governmental role in New Zealand.

Britain was motivated by the desire to forestall the New Zealand Company and other European powers (France established a very small settlement at Akaroa in the South Island later in 1840), to facilitate settlement by British subjects and, possibly, to end the lawlessness of European (predominantly British and American) whalers, sealers and traders. Officials and missionaries had their own positions and reputations to protect. Māori chiefs were motivated by a desire for protection from foreign powers, for the establishment of governorship over European settlers and traders in New Zealand, and for allowing wider European settlement that would increase trade and prosperity for Māori.

Governor Hobson died on 10 September 1842. Robert FitzRoy, the new governor (in office: 1843–1845), took some legal steps to recognise Māori custom. However, his successor, George Grey, promoted rapid cultural assimilation and reduction of the land-ownership, influence and rights of the Māori. The practical effect of the Treaty was, in the beginning, only gradually felt, especially in predominantly Māori regions, where the settler government had little or no authority.

== Colonial period ==
The Colony of New South Wales was founded by 1788. According to the future Governor, Captain Arthur Phillip's amended Commission, dated 25 April 1787 the colony of New South Wales included "all the islands adjacent in the Pacific Ocean within the latitudes of 10°37'S and 43°39'S". In 1825 with Van Diemen's Land becoming a separate colony, the southern boundary of New South Wales was altered to the islands adjacent in the Pacific Ocean with a southern boundary of 39°12'S which included only the northern half of the North Island. However, these boundaries had no real effect as the New South Wales administration had little interest in New Zealand.

New Zealand was first mentioned in British statute in the Murders Abroad Act 1817. It made it easier for a court to punish "murders or manslaughters committed in places not within His Majesty's dominions", and the Governor of New South Wales was given increased legal authority over New Zealand. The jurisdiction of the Supreme Court of New South Wales over New Zealand was initiated in the New South Wales Act 1823, and lesser offences were included at that time.

=== Establishing the colony ===
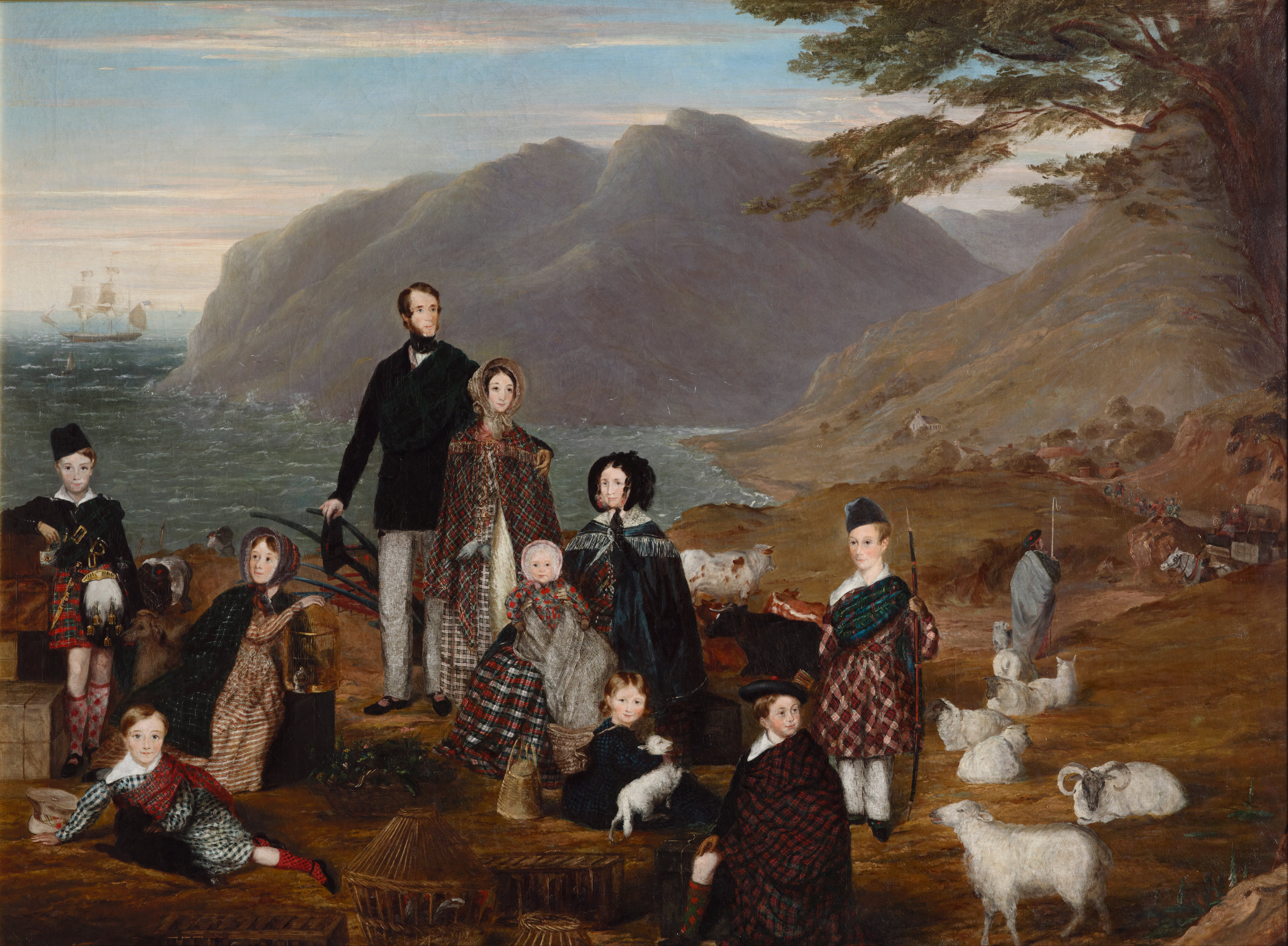
Scottish Highland family migrating to New Zealand, 1844, by William Allsworth. Museum of New Zealand Te Papa Tongarewa, Wellington.

William Hobson declared British sovereignty over all New Zealand on 21 May 1840, at which point he became its Lieutenant governor. At first New Zealand was administered from Australia as part of the colony of New South Wales, and from 16 June 1840 New South Wales laws were deemed to operate in New Zealand. This was a transitional arrangement, and the British Government issued the Charter for Erecting the Colony of New Zealand on 16 November 1840. The Charter stated that the Colony of New Zealand would be established as a Crown colony separate from New South Wales on 3 May 1841.

Settlement continued under British plans, inspired by a vision of New Zealand as a new land of opportunity. In 1846, the British Parliament passed the New Zealand Constitution Act 1846 for self-government for the 13,000 settlers in New Zealand. The new Governor, George Grey, suspended the plans. He argued that the Pākehā could not be trusted to pass laws that would protect the interests of the Māori majority – already there had been Treaty violations – and persuaded his political superiors to postpone its introduction for five years.

The Church of England sponsored the Canterbury Association colony with assisted passages from Great Britain in the early 1850s. As a result of the influx of settlers, the Pākehā population grew explosively from fewer than 1000 in 1831 to 500,000 by 1881. Some 400,000 settlers came from Britain, of whom 300,000 stayed permanently. Most were young people and 250,000 babies were born. The passage of 120,000 was paid by the colonial government. After 1880, immigration reduced, and growth was due chiefly to the excess of births over deaths.

=== New Zealand Company ===
The New Zealand Company was responsible for 15,500 settlers coming to New Zealand. Company prospectuses did not always tell the truth, and often colonists would only find out the reality once they had arrived in New Zealand. This private colonisation project was part of the reason that the British Colonial Office decided to speed up its plans for the annexation of New Zealand. Edward Gibbon Wakefield (1796–1862) had a far-reaching influence by helping create the New Zealand Company. Due to his conviction and three-year imprisonment for abducting an heiress, his role in forming the New Zealand Company was necessarily out of sight from the public. Wakefield's colonisation programmes were over-elaborate and operated on a much smaller scale than he hoped for, but his ideas influenced law and culture, especially his vision for the colony as the embodiment of post-Enlightenment ideals, the notion of New Zealand as a model society, and the sense of fairness in employer-employee relations.

=== New Zealand Wars ===
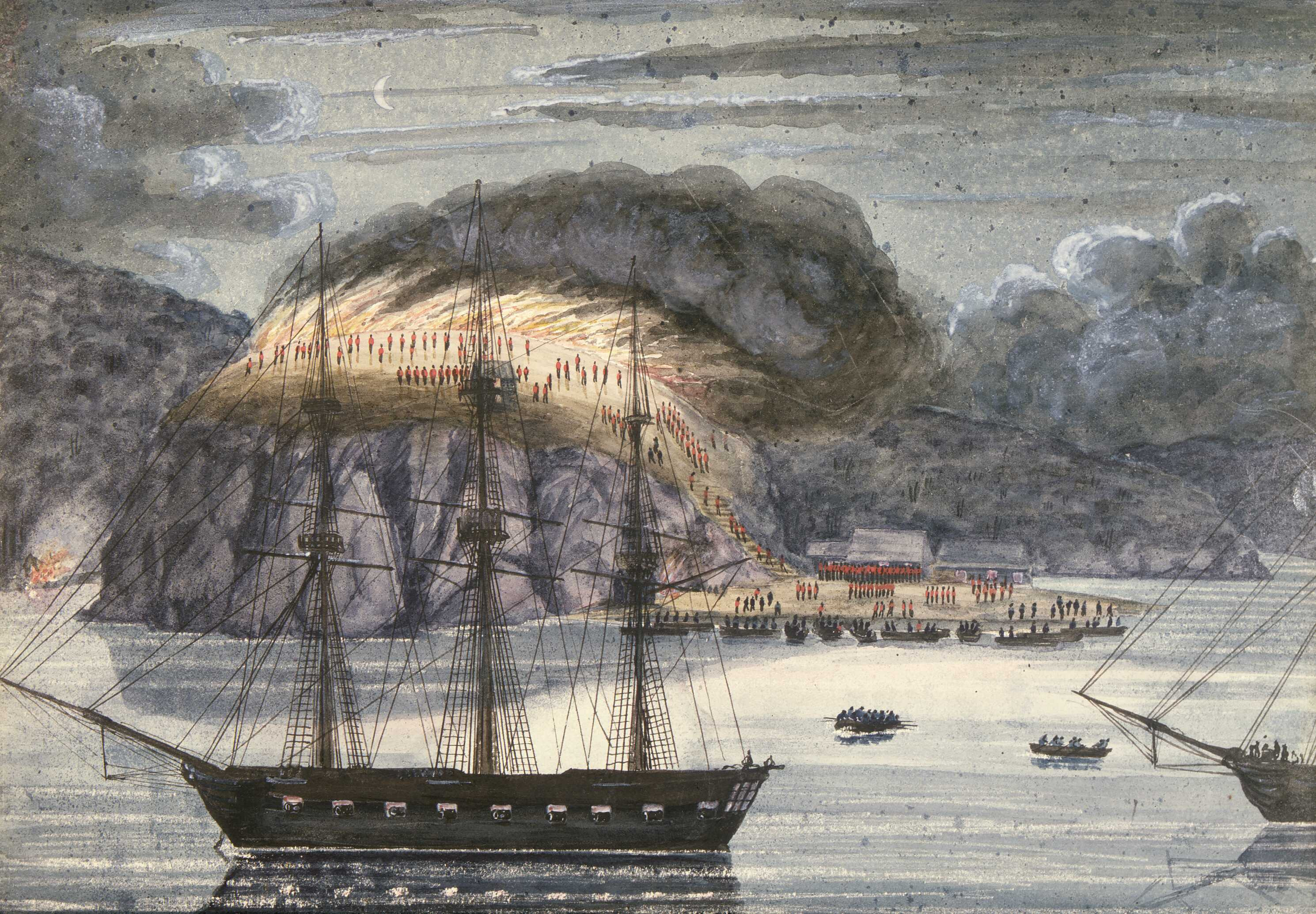
HMS North Star destroying Pomare's Pā during the Northern/Flagstaff War, 1845, Painting by John Williams.

Māori had welcomed Pākehā for the trading opportunities and guns they brought. However it soon became clear that they had underestimated the number of settlers that would arrive in their lands. Iwi (tribes) whose land was the base of the main settlements quickly lost much of their land and autonomy through government acts. Others prospered – until about 1860 the city of Auckland bought most of its food from Māori who grew and sold it themselves. Many iwi owned flour mills, ships and other items of European technology, and some exported food to Australia for a brief period during the 1850s gold rush. Although race relations were generally peaceful in this period, there were conflicts over who had ultimate power in particular areas – the Governor or the Māori chiefs. One such conflict was the Northern or Flagstaff War of the 1840s, during which Kororareka was sacked.

As the Pākehā population grew, pressure grew on Māori to sell more land. Land was used communally but under the mana of chiefs. In Māori culture, there was no such idea as selling land until the arrival of Europeans. The means of acquiring land was to defeat another hapu or iwi in battle and seize their land. Te Rauparaha seized the land of many iwi in the lower North Island and upper South Island during the musket wars. Land was usually not given up without discussion and consultation. When an iwi was divided over the question of selling this could lead to great difficulties as at Waitara.

Pākehā had little understanding of Māori views on land and accused Māori of holding onto land they did not use efficiently. Competition for land was one important cause of the New Zealand Wars of the 1860s and 1870s, in which the Taranaki and Waikato regions were invaded by colonial troops and Māori of these regions had some of their land taken from them. The wars and confiscation left bitterness that remains to this day. After the conclusion of the wars some iwi, especially in the Waikato, such as Ngati Haua sold land freely.

Some iwi (kūpapa) sided with the government and later fought with the government. They were motivated partly by the thought that an alliance with the government would benefit them, and partly by old feuds with the iwi they fought against. One result of their co-operation strategy was the establishment of the four Māori electorates in the House of Representatives, in 1867.

After the wars, some Māori began a strategy of passive resistance, most famously the ploughing campaigns at Parihaka on 26 May 1879 in Taranaki. Most, such as Ngāpuhi and Te Arawa, continued co-operating with Pākehā. For example, tourism ventures were established by Te Arawa around Rotorua. Resisting and co-operating iwi both found that Pākehā desire for land remained. In the last decades of the century, most iwi lost substantial amounts of land through the activities of the Native Land Court. Due to its Eurocentric rules, the high fees, its location remote from the lands in question, and unfair practices by some Pākehā land agents, its main effect was to allow Māori to sell their land without restraint from other tribal members.

The effects of disease, as well as war, confiscations, assimilation and intermarriage, land loss leading to poor housing and alcohol abuse, and general disillusionment, caused a fall in the Māori population from around 86,000 in 1769 to around 70,000 in 1840 and around 48,000 by 1874, hitting a low point of 42,000 in 1896. Subsequently, their numbers began to recover.

=== Self-government, 1850s ===
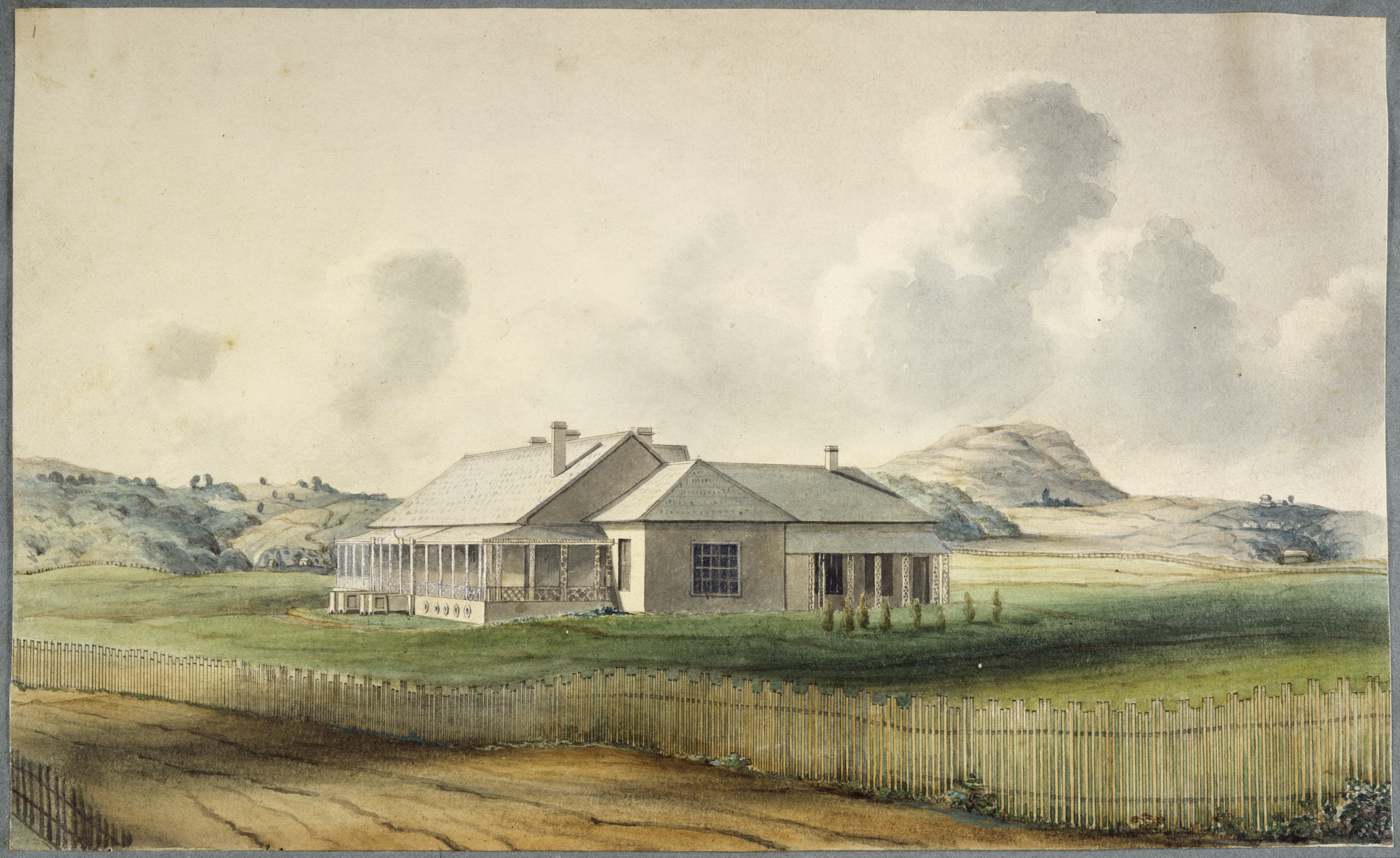
The first Government House in Auckland, as painted by Edward Ashworth in 1842 or 1843. Auckland was the second capital of New Zealand.

In response to increased petitioning for self-governance from the growing number of British settlers, the British Parliament passed the New Zealand Constitution Act 1852, setting up a central government with an elected General Assembly (Parliament) and six provincial governments. The General Assembly did not meet until 24 May 1854, 16 months after the Constitution Act had come into force. Provinces were reorganised in 1846 and in 1853, when they acquired their own legislatures, and then abolished with effect in 1877. The settlers soon won the right to responsible government (with an executive supported by a majority in the elected assembly). But the governor, and through him the Colonial Office in London, retained control of native policy until the mid-1860s.

=== Farming and mining ===
The Māori tribes at first sold the land to the settlers, but the government voided the sales in 1840. Now only the government was allowed to purchase land from Māori, who received cash. The government bought practically all the useful land, then resold it to the New Zealand Company, which promoted immigration, or leased it for sheep runs. The Company resold the best tracts to British settlers; its profits were used to pay the travel of the immigrants from Britain.

Because of the vast distances involved, the first settlers were self-sufficient farmers. By the 1840s, however, large scale sheep stations were exporting large quantities of wool to the textile mills of England. Most of the early settlers were brought over by a programme operated by the New Zealand Company and were located in the central region on either side of Cook Strait, and at Wellington, Wanganui, New Plymouth and Nelson. These settlements had access to some of the richest plains in the country and after refrigerated ships appeared in 1882, they developed into closely settled regions of small-scale farming. Outside these compact settlements were the sheep runs. Pioneer pastoralists, often men with experience as squatters in Australia, leased lands from the government at the annual rate of £5 plus £1 for each 1,000 sheep above the first 5,000. The leases were renewed automatically, which gave the wealthy pastoralists a strong landed interest and made them a powerful political force. In all between 1856 and 1876, 8.1 million acres were sold for £7.6 million, and 2.2 million acres were given free to soldiers, sailors and settlers. With an economy based on agriculture, the landscape was transformed from forest to farmland.

Gold discoveries in Otago (1861) and Westland (1865), caused a worldwide gold rush that more than doubled the population in a short period, from 71,000 in 1859 to 164,000 in 1863. The value of trade increased fivefold from £2 million to £10 million. As the gold boom ended, Colonial Treasurer and later (from 1873) Premier Julius Vogel borrowed money from British investors and launched in 1870 an ambitious programme of public works and infrastructure investment, together with a policy of assisted immigration. Successive governments expanded the programme with offices across Britain that enticed settlers and gave them and their families one-way tickets.

From about 1865, the economy lapsed into a long depression as a result of the withdrawal of British troops, peaking of gold production in 1866 and Vogel's borrowing and the associated debt burden (especially on land). Despite a brief boom in wheat, prices for farm products sagged. The market for land seized up. Hard times led to urban unemployment and sweated labour (exploitative labour conditions) in industry. The country lost people through emigration, mostly to Australia.

=== Vogel era ===
In 1870 Julius Vogel introduced his grand go-ahead policy to dispel the slump with increased immigration and overseas borrowing to fund new railways, roads and telegraph lines. Local banks – notably the Bank of New Zealand and the Colonial Bank of New Zealand — were "reckless" and permitted "a frenzy of private borrowing". The public debt had increased from £7.8 million in 1870 to £18.6 million in 1876. But 718 miles (1,156 km) of railway had been built with 427 miles (687 km) under construction. 2,000 miles (3,200 km) of road had been opened, and electric telegraph lines increased from 699 miles (1,125 km) in 1866 to 3,170 miles (5,100 km) in 1876. A record number of immigrants arrived in 1874 (32,000 of the 44,000 were government assisted) and the population rose from 248,000 in 1870 to 399,000 in 1876.

=== Women ===
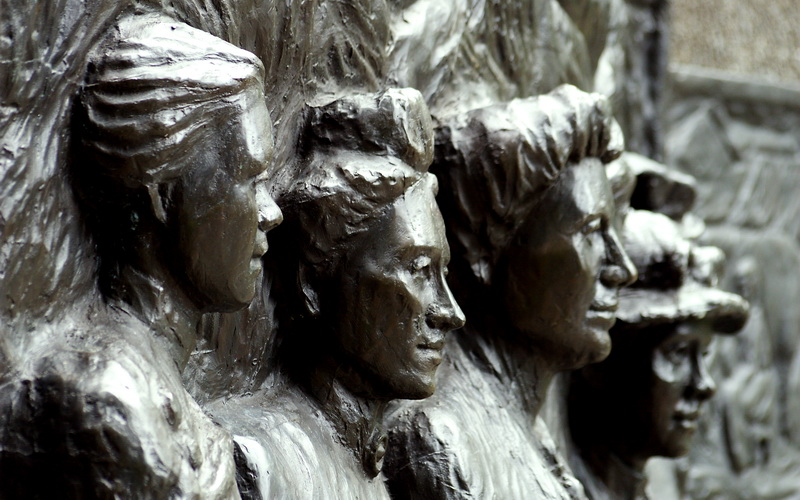
Tribute to the Suffragettes memorial in Christchurch adjacent to Our City. The figures shown from left to right are Amey Daldy, Kate Sheppard, Ada Wells and Harriet Morison

Although norms of masculinity were dominant, strong minded women originated a feminist movement starting in the 1860s, well before women gained the right to vote in 1893. Middle-class women employed the media (especially newspapers) to communicate with each other and define their priorities. Prominent feminist writers included Mary Taylor, Mary Colclough (pseud. Polly Plum), and Ellen Elizabeth Ellis. The first signs of a politicised collective female identity came in crusades to pass the Contagious Diseases Prevention Act.

Feminists by the 1880s were using the rhetoric of "white slavery" to reveal men's sexual and social oppression of women. By demanding that men take responsibility for the right of women to walk the streets in safety, New Zealand feminists deployed the rhetoric of white slavery to argue for women's sexual and social freedom. Middle-class women successfully mobilised to stop prostitution, especially during the First World War.

Māori women developed their own form of feminism, derived from Māori nationalism rather than European sources.

In 1893 Elizabeth Yates was elected mayor of Onehunga, making her the first woman in the British Empire to hold the office. She was an able administrator: she cut the debt, reorganised the fire brigade, and improved the roads and sanitation. Many men were hostile however, and she was defeated for re-election. Hutching argues that after 1890 women were increasingly well organised through the National Council of Women, the Women's Christian Temperance Union, the Women's International League, and others. By 1910 they were campaigning for peace, and against compulsory military training, and conscription. They demanded arbitration and the peaceful resolution of international disputes. The women argued that women-hood (thanks to motherhood) was the repository of superior moral values and concerns and from their domestic experience they knew best how to resolve conflicts.

=== Schools ===
Prior to 1877 schools were operated by the provincial government, churches, or by private subscription. Education was not a requirement and many children did not attend any school, especially farm children whose labour was important to the family economy. The quality of education provided varied substantially depending on the school. The Education Act of 1877 created New Zealand's first free national system of primary education, establishing standards that educators should meet, and making education compulsory for children aged 5 to 15.

=== Immigration ===
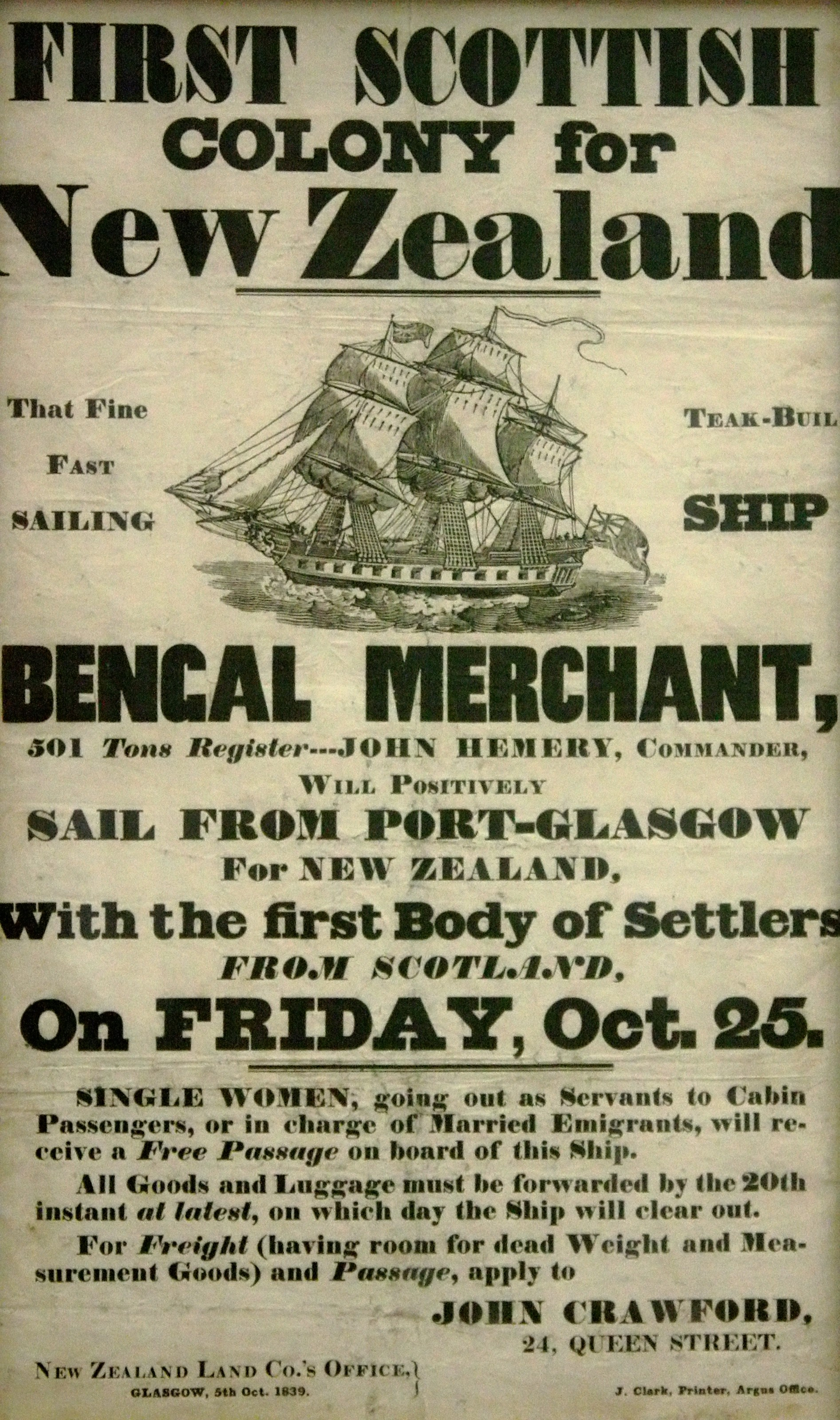
"First Scottish Colony for New Zealand" – 1839 poster advertising emigration from Scotland to New Zealand. Collection of Kelvingrove Art Gallery and Museum, Glasgow, Scotland.

From 1840 there was considerable European settlement, primarily from England and Wales, Scotland and Ireland; and to a lesser extent the United States, India, China, and various parts of continental Europe, including the province of Dalmatia in what is now Croatia, and Bohemia in what is now the Czech Republic. Already a majority of the population by 1859, the number of Pākehā settlers increased rapidly to reach over one million by 1916.

In the 1870s and 1880s, several thousand Chinese men, mostly from Guangdong, migrated to New Zealand to work on the South Island goldfields. Although the first Chinese migrants had been invited by the Otago Provincial government they quickly became the target of hostility from white settlers and laws were enacted specifically to discourage them from coming to New Zealand.

=== Gold Rush and South Island growth ===
In 1861 gold was discovered at Gabriel's Gully in Central Otago, sparking a gold rush. Dunedin became the wealthiest city in the country and many in the South Island resented financing the North Island's wars. In 1865 Parliament defeated a proposal to make the South Island independent by 17 to 31.

The South Island was home to most of the Pākehā population until around 1911 when the North Island again took the lead, and has supported an ever-greater majority of the country's total population through the 20th century and into the 21st.

Scottish immigrants dominated the South Island and evolved ways to bridge the old homeland and the new. Many local Caledonian societies were formed. They organised sports teams to entice the young and preserved an idealised Scottish national myth (based on Robert Burns) for the elderly. They gave Scots a path to assimilation and cultural integration as Scottish New Zealanders. The settlement of Scots in the Deep South is reflected in the lasting predominance of Presbyterianism in the South Island.

=== 1890–1914 ===
==== Politics ====
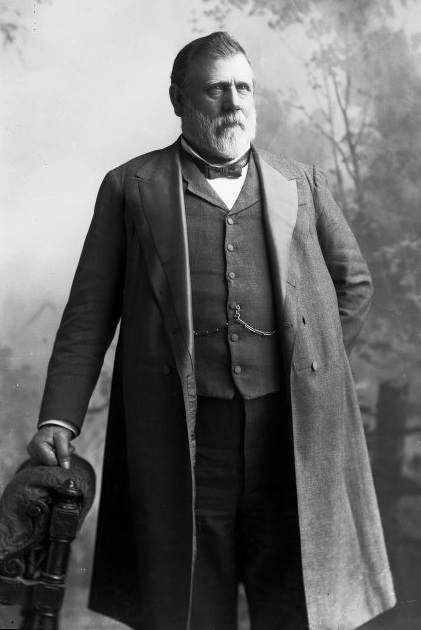
Richard Seddon, Liberal Prime Minister from 1893 to his death in 1906, pictured here in 1905

The pre-war era saw the advent of party politics, with the establishment of the Liberal Government. The landed gentry and aristocracy ruled Britain at this time. New Zealand never had an aristocracy but it did have wealthy landowners who largely controlled politics before 1891. The Liberal Party set out to change that by a policy it called "populism". Richard Seddon had proclaimed the goal as early as 1884: "It is the rich and the poor; it is the wealthy and the landowners against the middle and labouring classes. That, Sir, shows the real political position of New Zealand." The Liberal strategy was to create a large class of small land-owning farmers who supported Liberal ideals.

To obtain land for farmers the Liberal government from 1891 to 1911 purchased 3.1 million acres of Māori land. The government also purchased 1.3 million acres from large estate holders for subdivision and closer settlement by small farmers. The Advances to Settlers Act of 1894 provided low-interest mortgages, while the Agriculture Department disseminated information on the best farming methods.

The 1909 Native Land Act allowed the Māori to sell land to private buyers. Māori still owned five million acres by 1920; they leased three million acres and used one million acres for themselves. The Liberals proclaimed success in forging an egalitarian, anti-monopoly land policy. The policy built up support for the Liberal party in rural North Island electorates. By 1903 the Liberals were so dominant that there was no longer an organised opposition in Parliament.

The Liberal government laid the foundations of the later comprehensive welfare state: introducing old age pensions; maximum hour regulations; pioneering minimum wage laws; and developing a system for settling industrial disputes, which was accepted by both employers and trade unions, to start with. In 1893 it extended voting rights to women, making New Zealand the first country in the world to enact universal female suffrage.

New Zealand gained international attention for its reforms, especially how the state regulated labour relations. The effect was especially strong on the reform movement in the United States.

Coleman argues that the Liberals in 1891 lacked a clear-cut ideology to guide them. Instead they approached the nation's problems pragmatically, keeping in mind the constraints imposed by democratic public opinion. To deal with the issue of land distribution, they worked out innovative solutions to access, tenure, and a graduated tax on unimproved values.

==== Economic developments ====
In the 1870s Julius Vogel's grand go-ahead policy of borrowing overseas had increased the public debt from £7.8 million in 1870 to £18.6 million in 1876, but had constructed many miles of railways, roads and telegraph lines and attracted many new migrants.

In the 1880s, New Zealand's economy grew from one based on wool and local trade to the export of wool, cheese, butter and frozen beef and mutton to Britain. The change was enabled by the invention of refrigerated steamships in 1882 and a result of the large market demands overseas. In order to increase production, alongside a more intensive use of factor inputs a transformation of production techniques was necessary. The required capital came mainly from outside of New Zealand. Refrigerated shipping remained the basis of New Zealand's economy until the 1970s. New Zealand's highly productive agriculture gave it probably the world's highest standard of living, with fewer at the rich and poor ends of the scale.

During this era (c. 1880 – c. 1914) the banking system was weak and there was little foreign investment, so businessmen had to build up their own capital. Historians have debated whether the "long depression" of the late 19th century stifled investment, but the New Zealanders found a way around adverse conditions. Hunter has studied the experiences of 133 entrepreneurs who started commercial enterprises between 1880 and 1910. The successful strategy was to deploy capital economising techniques, and reinvesting profits rather than borrowing. The result was slow but stable growth that avoided bubbles and led to long-lived family owned firms.

=== Option of becoming a state within the Commonwealth of Australia ===
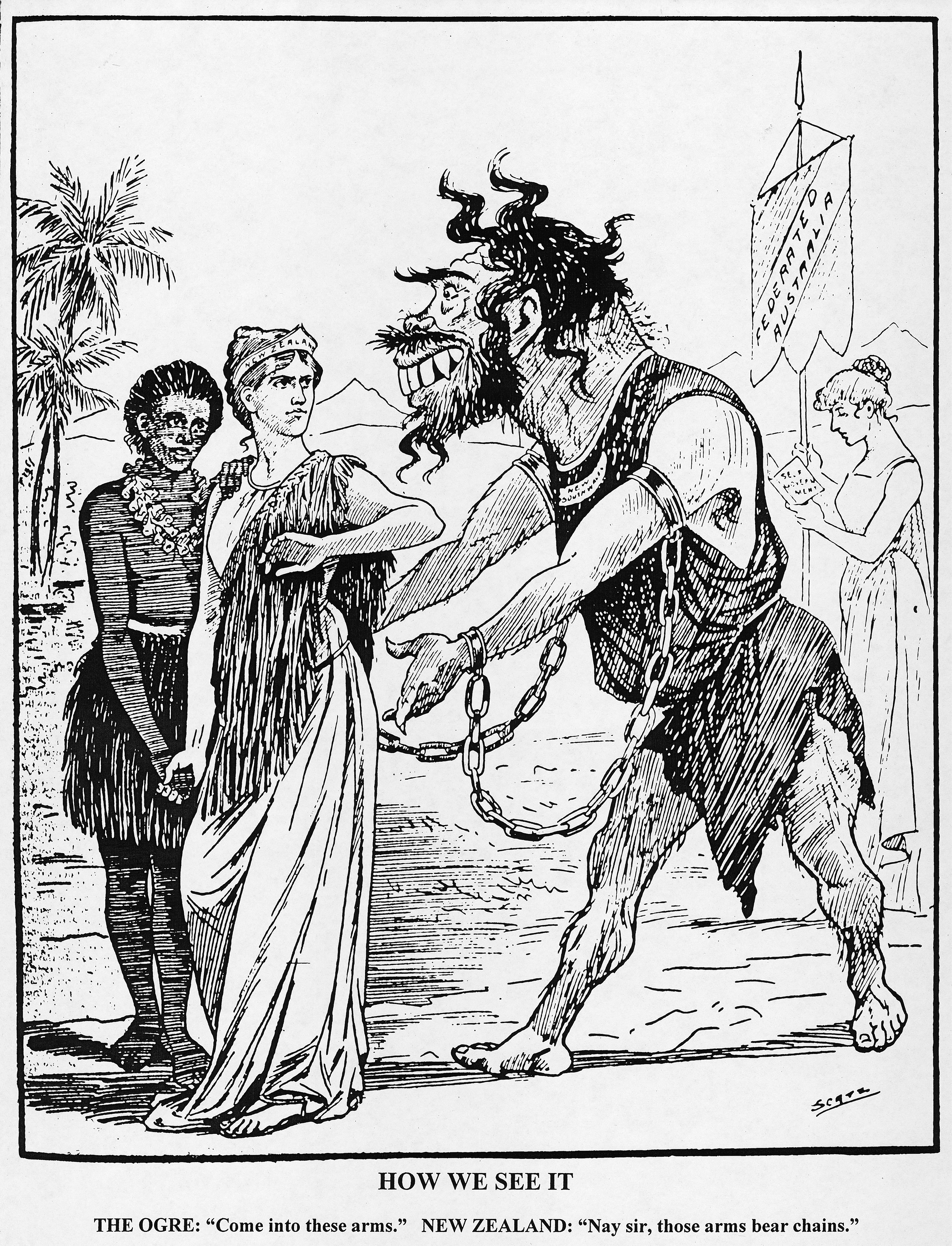
Zealandia rejecting Australian Constitution in 1900

The premier of New Zealand, Richard Seddon, opposed the idea of uniting the colonies. He set up a Royal Commission on the topic in 1900. Despite some support for becoming an Australian state from the farming community which feared new trade restrictions if New Zealand did not unite with Australia, there was majority opposition to the idea. The prevailing opinion was that Australians were more economic rivals than partners, with New Zealand trade being mostly with the United Kingdom. New Zealand remained a separate colony when the Commonwealth of Australia was created on 1 January 1901, ushering in the 20th century.

=== Dominion status ===
Just under one million people lived in New Zealand in 1907, with cities such as Auckland and Wellington growing rapidly. Other large parts of the Empire with self-governing white populations had undergone name changes away from the word 'colony', and prime minister Joseph Ward sought the same for New Zealand, preferring the term 'Dominion'. He raised the issue at the 1907 Imperial Conference in London, and wrote to Lord Elgin, the colonial secretary, that New Zealand had "outgrown the 'colonial' stage", requesting that the name 'Colony of New Zealand' be changed to 'Dominion of New Zealand'. The name change to 'Dominion' for several colonies, including New Zealand, was made by Order of Council on 10 September 1907, taking effect in New Zealand on 26 September. New Zealand politicians had generally liked the proposed change: once it had happened, the public remained broadly indifferent and some media questioned its relevance.

=== Temperance and prohibition ===
In New Zealand, prohibition was a moralistic reform movement begun in the mid-1880s by the Protestant evangelical and Nonconformist churches and the Women's Christian Temperance Union New Zealand and after 1890 by the Prohibition League. It never achieved its goal of national prohibition. It was a middle-class movement which accepted the existing economic and social order; the effort to legislate morality assumed that individual redemption was all that was needed to carry the colony forward from a pioneering society to a more mature one. However, both the Church of England and the largely Irish Catholic Church rejected prohibition as an intrusion of government into the church's domain, while the growing labour movement saw capitalism rather than alcohol as the enemy. Reformers hoped that the women's vote, in which New Zealand was a pioneer, would swing the balance, but the women were not as well organised as in other countries. Prohibition had a majority in a national referendum in 1911, but needed a 60% majority to pass. The movement kept trying in the 1920s, losing three more referendums by close votes; it managed to keep in place a 6 pm closing hour for pubs and Sunday closing (leading to the so-called six o'clock swill). The Depression and war years effectively ended the movement.

=== First World War ===
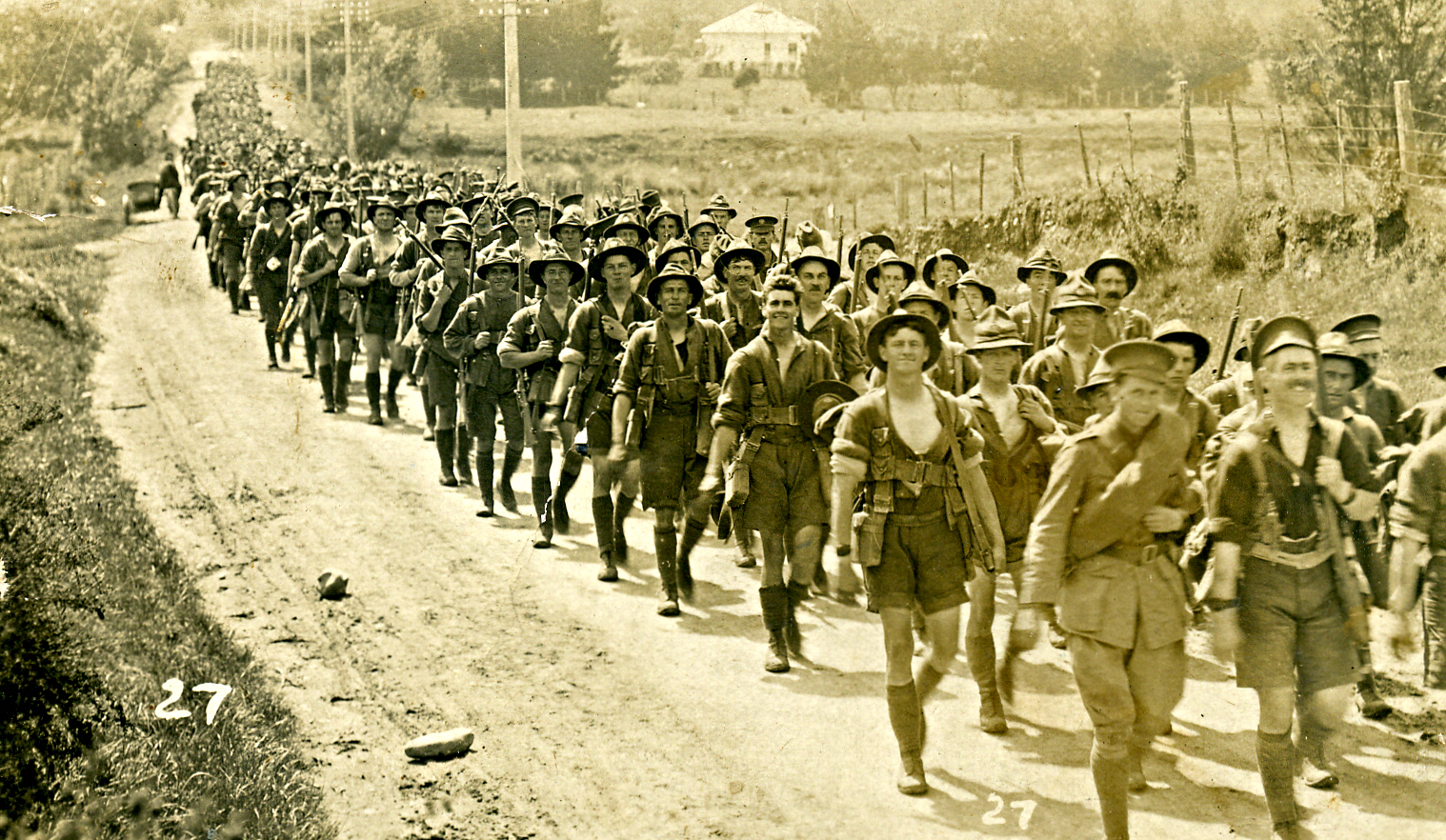
New Zealand Division in 1916

The country remained an enthusiastic member of the British Empire. The date the outbreak of World War I is marked in New Zealand is 4 August. During the war, more than 120,000 New Zealanders enlisted to the New Zealand Expeditionary Force, and around 100,000 served overseas; 18,000 died, 499 were taken prisoner, and about 41,000 men were listed as wounded. Conscription had been in force since 1909, and while it was opposed in peacetime there was less opposition during the war. The labour movement was pacifistic, opposed the war, and alleged that the rich were benefiting at the expense of the workers. It formed the New Zealand Labour Party in 1916. Māori tribes that had been close to the government sent their young men to volunteer. Unlike in Britain, relatively few women became involved. Women did serve as nurses; 640 joined the services and 500 went overseas.

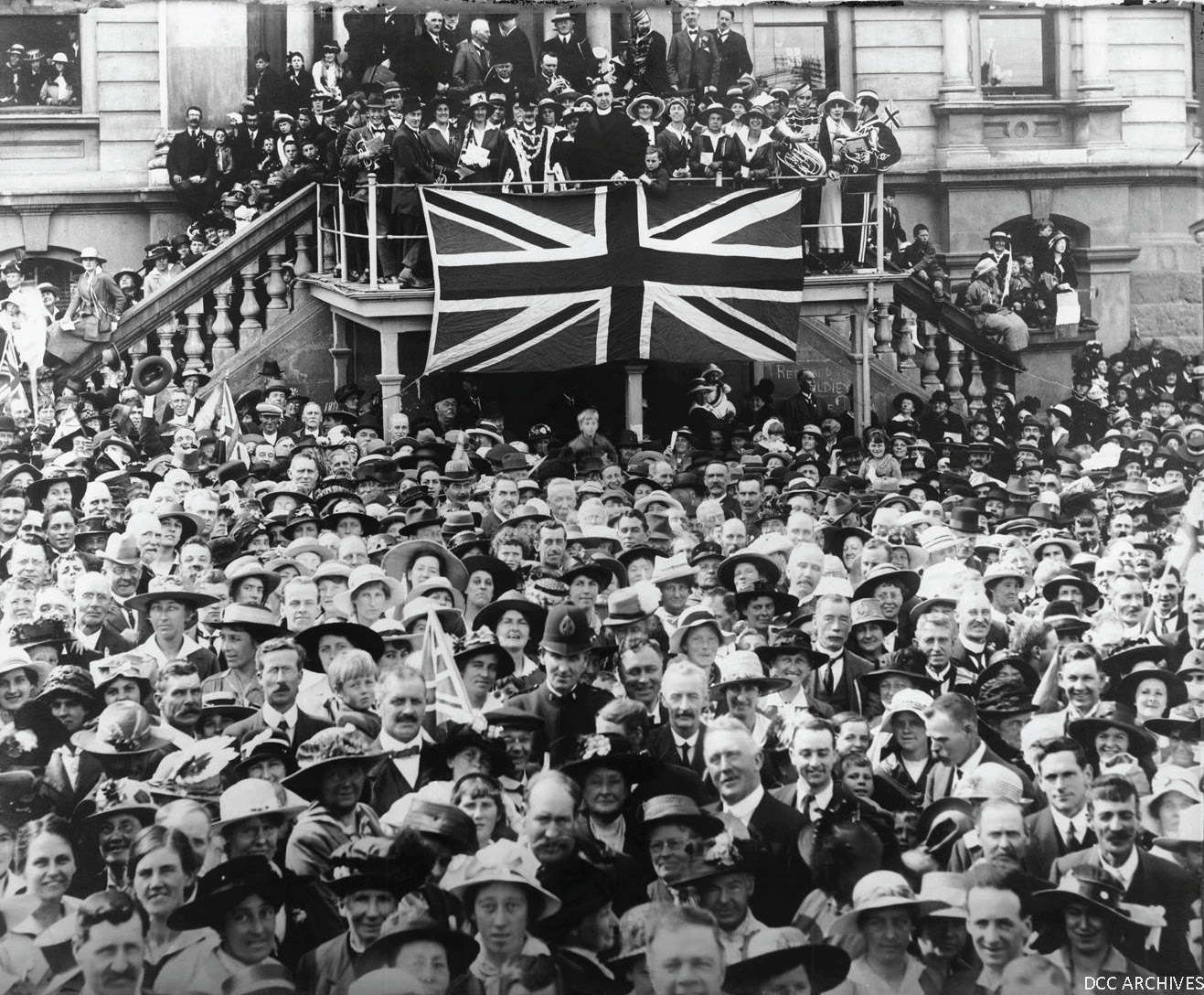
Residents of Dunedin celebrate the news of the Armistice of 11 November 1918.

New Zealand forces captured Western Samoa from Germany in the early stages of the war, and New Zealand administered the country until Samoan Independence in 1962. However Samoans greatly resented the imperialism, and blamed inflation and the catastrophic 1918 flu epidemic on New Zealand rule.

More than 2700 men died in the Gallipoli Campaign. The heroism of the soldiers in the failed campaign made their sacrifices iconic in New Zealand memory, and is often credited with securing the psychological independence of the nation.

=== Imperial loyalties ===
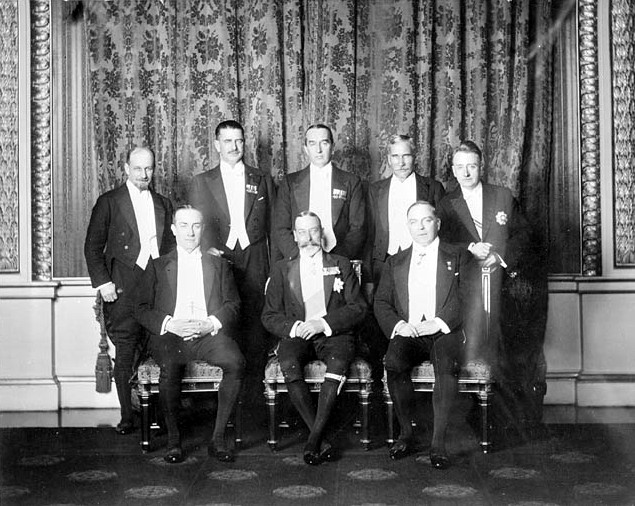
George V with his prime ministers at the 1926 Imperial Conference. Standing (left to right): Monroe (Newfoundland), Coates (New Zealand), Bruce (Australia), Hertzog (Union of South Africa), Cosgrave (Irish Free State). Seated: Baldwin (UK), King George V, King (Canada).

After the war New Zealand signed the Treaty of Versailles (1919), joined the League of Nations and pursued an independent foreign policy, while its defence was still controlled by Britain. New Zealand depended on Britain's Royal Navy for its military security during the 1920s and 1930s. Officials in Wellington trusted Conservative Party governments in London, but not Labour. When the British Labour Party took power in 1924 and 1929, the New Zealand government felt threatened by Labour's foreign policy because of its reliance upon the League of Nations. The League was distrusted and Wellington did not expect to see the coming of a peaceful world order under League auspices. What had been the Empire's most loyal dominion became a dissenter as it opposed efforts by the first and second British Labour governments to trust the League's framework of arbitration and collective security agreements.

The governments of the Reform and United parties between 1912 and 1935 followed a "realistic" foreign policy. They made national security a high priority, were sceptical of international institutions, and showed no interest on the questions of self-determination, democracy, and human rights. However the opposition Labour Party was more idealistic and proposed a liberal internationalist outlook on international affairs.

=== Labour movement ===
The Labour Party emerged as a force in 1919 with a socialist platform. It won about 25% of the vote. However its appeals to working class solidarity were not effective because a large fraction of the working class voted for conservative candidates of the Liberal and Reform parties. (They merged in 1936 to form the New Zealand National Party.) As a consequence the Labour party was able to jettison its support for socialism in 1927 (a policy made official in 1951), as it expanded its reach into middle class constituencies. The result was a jump in strength to 35% in 1931, 47% in 1935, and peaking at 56% in 1938. From 1935 the First Labour Government showed a limited degree of idealism in foreign policy, for example opposing the appeasement of Germany and Japan.

=== Great Depression ===
Like many other countries, New Zealand suffered in the Great Depression of the 1930s, which affected the country via its international trade, with steep decreases in farm exports subsequently affecting the money supply and in turn consumption, investment and imports. The country was most affected around 1930–1932, when average farm incomes for a short time dipped below zero, and the unemployment rate peaked. Though actual unemployment numbers were not officially counted, the country was affected especially strongly in the North Island.

Unlike in later years, there were no public benefit ("dole") payments – the unemployed were given "relief work", much of which was however not very productive, partly because the size of the problem was unprecedented. Women also increasingly registered as unemployed, while Māori received government help through other channels such as the land-development schemes organised by Sir Āpirana Ngata, who served as Minister of Native Affairs from 1928 to 1934. In 1933, 8.5% of the unemployed were organised in work camps, while the rest received work close to their homes. Typical occupations in relief work included road work (undertaken by 45% of all part-time and 19% of all full-time relief workers in 1934, with park improvement works (17%) and farm work (31%) being the other two most common types of work for part-time and full-time relief workers respectively).

=== Building the welfare state ===
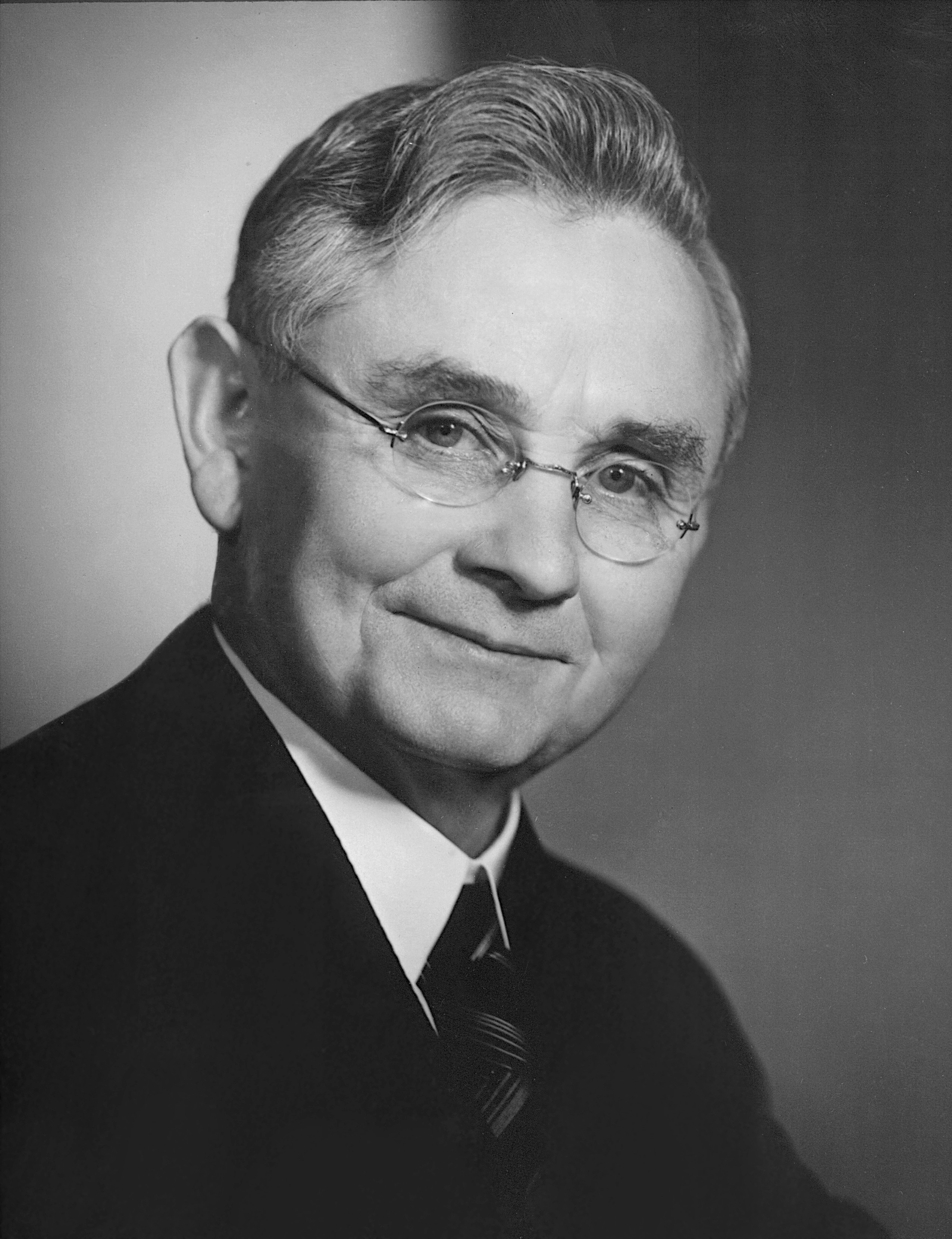
Michael Joseph Savage, Labour Prime Minister 1935–1940. This portrait was hung on the walls of many supporters.

Attempts by the United–Reform Coalition to deal with the situation with spending cuts and relief work were ineffective and unpopular. In 1935, the First Labour Government was elected, and the post-depression decade showed that average Labour support in New Zealand had roughly doubled comparable to pre-depression times. By 1935 economic conditions had improved somewhat, and the new government had more positive financial conditions. Prime Minister Michael Joseph Savage proclaimed that: "Social Justice must be the guiding principle and economic organisation must adapt itself to social needs."

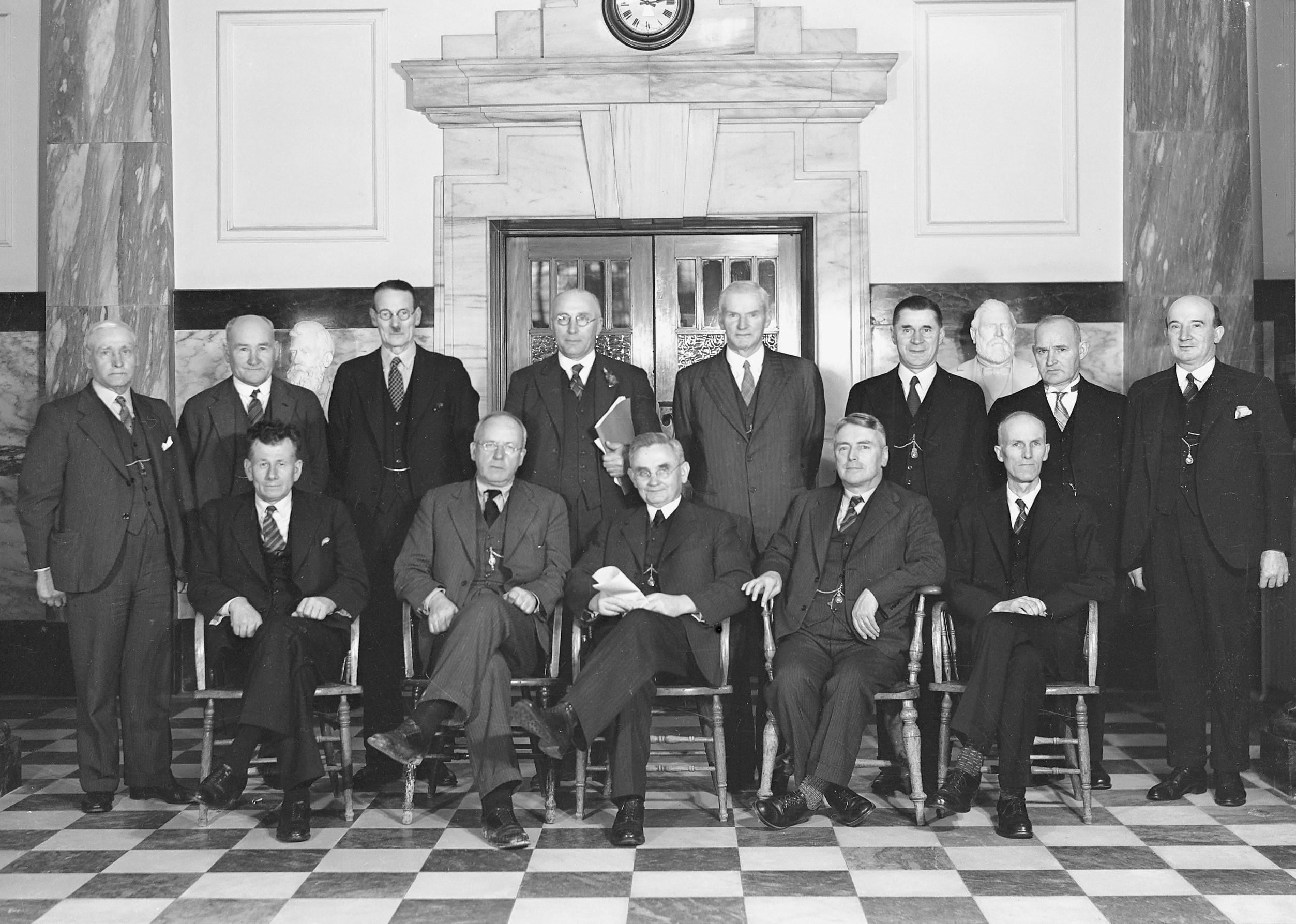
The 1935 Labour Cabinet. Michael Joseph Savage is seated in the front row, centre.

The new government quickly set about implementing a number of significant reforms, including a reorganisation of the social welfare system and the creation of the state housing scheme. Labour also gained Māori votes by working closely with the Rātana movement. Savage was idolised by the working classes, and his portrait hung on the walls of many houses around the country. The newly created welfare state promised government support to individuals "from the cradle to the grave", according to the Labour slogan. It included free health care and education, and state assistance for the elderly, infirm, and unemployed. The opposition attacked the Labour Party's more left-wing policies, and accused it of undermining free enterprise and hard work. The Reform Party and the United Party merged to become the National Party, and would be Labour's main rival in future years. However the welfare state system was retained and expanded by successive National and Labour governments until the 1980s.

=== 1930s foreign policy ===
In foreign policy, the Labour Party in power after 1935 disliked the Versailles Treaty of 1919 as too harsh on Germany, opposed militarism and arms build-ups, distrusted the political conservatism of the National Government in Britain, sympathised with the Soviet Union, and increasingly worried about threats from Japan. It denounced Italy's role in Ethiopia and sympathised with the republican forces in the Spanish Civil War. Those policies favoured the left but it also was pro-German. It consistently advocated negotiations with Nazi Germany, signed a trade agreement with it, welcomed the Munich agreement of 1938 regarding the division of Czechoslovakia, discouraged public criticism of the Nazi regime, and pursued a slow rearmament programme. When World War II broke out in September 1939, it recommended to London a negotiated peace with Berlin; however after the fall of France in the spring of 1940, it did support the British war effort militarily and economically.

=== Second World War ===
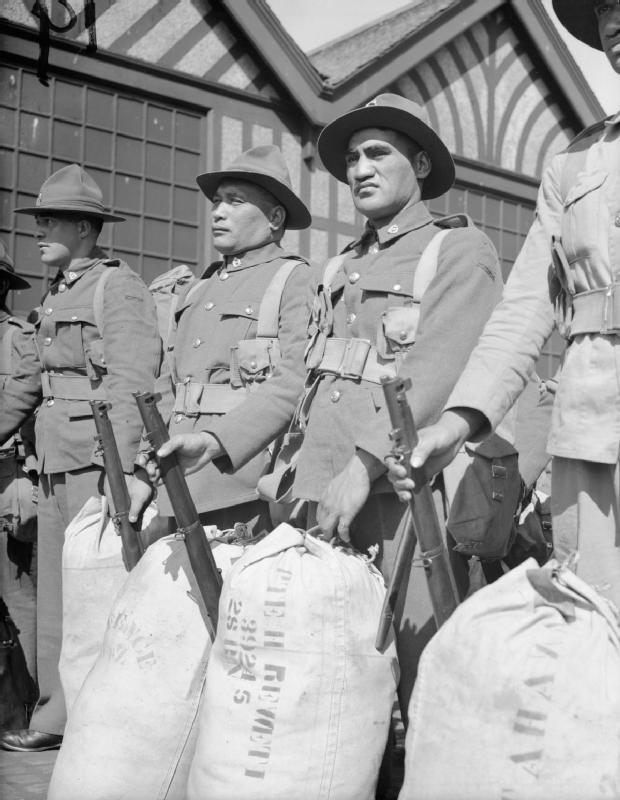
Men of the Māori Battalion, New Zealand Expeditionary Force, after disembarking at Gourock in Scotland in June 1940

When war broke out in 1939, New Zealanders saw their proper role as defending their proud place in the British Empire. It contributed some 120,000 troops.

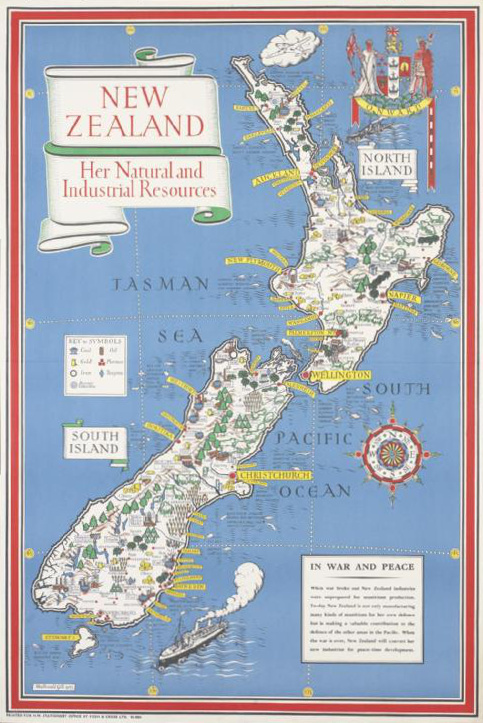
A 1943 poster produced during the war. The poster reads: "When war broke out ... industries were unprepared for munitions production. To-day New Zealand is not only manufacturing many kinds of munitions for her own defence but is making a valuable contribution to the defence of the other areas in the Pacific..."

New Zealand, with a population of 1.7 million, including 99,000 Māori, was highly mobilised during the war. The Labour party was in power and promoted unionisation and the welfare state. Agriculture expanded, sending record supplies of meat, butter and wool to Britain. When American forces arrived, they were fed as well.

The nation spent £574 million on the war, of which 43% came from taxes, 41% from loans and 16% from American Lend Lease. It was an era of prosperity as the national income soared from £158 million in 1937 to £292 million in 1944. Rationing and price controls kept inflation to only 14% during 1939–45.

Over £50 million was spent on defence works and military accommodation and hospitals, including 292 mi (470 km) of roads.

Montgomerie shows that the war dramatically increased the roles of women, especially married women, in the labour force. Most of them took traditional female jobs. Some replaced men but the changes here were temporary and reversed in 1945. After the war, women left traditional male occupations and many women gave up paid employment to return home. There was no radical change in gender roles but the war intensified occupational trends under way since the 1920s.

== Post-war era ==
=== Labour to National ===
Labour remained in power after the Second World War and in 1945, Labour Prime Minister Peter Fraser played an important role in the establishment of the United Nations, of which New Zealand was a founding member. However, domestically Labour had lost the reforming zeal of the 1930s and its electoral support ebbed after the war. After Labour lost power in 1949, the conservative National Party began an almost continuous thirty-year stint in government, interrupted by single-term Labour governments in 1957 to 60 and 1972 to 75. National Prime Minister Sidney Holland called a snap election as a result of the 1951 waterfront dispute, an incident that reinforced National's dominance and severely weakened the union movement.

=== The British connection ===
Fedorowich and Bridge argue that the demands of the Second World War produced long-term consequences for New Zealand's relationship with the government in London. The key component was the office of the high commissioner. By 1950 it was the main line of communications between the British and New Zealand governments.

1950s New Zealand culture was deeply British, with the concept of "fairness" holding a central role. New immigrants, still mainly British, flooded in while New Zealand remained prosperous by exporting farm products to Britain.

However, during the Korean War, cooperation with the United States set a direction of policy which resulted in the ANZUS Treaty between New Zealand, America and Australia in 1951. Decried by many, including British Prime Minister Winston Churchill, that the treaty excluding Britain, the ANZUS treaty was argued by the Government as complimenting British Commonwealth commitments.

In 1953 New Zealanders took pride that a countryman, Edmund Hillary, gave Queen Elizabeth II a coronation gift by reaching the summit of Mount Everest.

From the 1890s, the economy had been based almost entirely on the export of frozen meat and dairy products to Britain, and in 1961, the share of New Zealand exports going to the United Kingdom was still at slightly over 51%, with approximately 15% going to other European countries.

New Zealand’s entry into the Vietnam War provoked controversy and much protest. New Zealand's involvement in the Vietnam War signalled a major breakaway from British influence even though it was brought about primarily because of New Zealand's obligations under the ANZUS Treaty and growing concerns about Communist influences in the Asia-Pacific region. As a result, the United States pressured the governments of Australia and New Zealand to contribute to the war in Vietnam, eventually resulting in both nations sending forces, with New Zealand's first troops arriving in 1965. The Vietnam War was the first conflict that New Zealand entered that did not involve Britain.

Irrespective of political developments, many New Zealanders perceived themselves as a distinctive outlying branch of the United Kingdom until at least the 1970s. In 1973 Britain joined the European Economic Community (precursor of the European Union) and abrogated its preferential trade agreements with New Zealand, forcing New Zealand to find new markets. The UK was New Zealand’s largest trading partner, and New Zealanders felt a sense of betrayal recalling NZ’s sacrifices during WW2 to aid Britain.

=== Māori urbanisation ===
Māori always had a high birth rate; that was neutralised by a high death rate until modern public health measures became effective in the 20th century when tuberculosis deaths and infant mortality declined sharply. Life expectancy grew from 49 years in 1926 to 60 years in 1961 and the total numbers grew rapidly. Many Māori served in the Second World War and learned how to cope in the modern urban world; others moved from their rural homes to the cities to take up jobs vacated by Pākehā servicemen. The shift to the cities was also caused by their strong birth rates in the early 20th century, with the existing rural farms in Māori ownership having increasing difficulty in providing enough jobs. Māori culture had meanwhile undergone a renaissance thanks in part to politician Āpirana Ngata. By the 1980s 80% of the Māori population was urban, in contrast to only 20% before the Second World War. The migration led to better pay, higher standards of living and longer schooling, but also exposed problems of racism and discrimination. By the late 1960s a Māori protest movement had emerged to combat racism, promote Māori culture and seek fulfilment of the Treaty of Waitangi.

Urbanisation proceeded rapidly across the land. In the late 1940s, town planners noted that the country was "possibly the third most urbanised country in the world", with two-thirds of the population living in cities or towns. There was also increasing concern that this trend was badly managed, with it being noted that there was an "ill-defined urban pattern that appears to have few of the truly desirable urban qualities and yet manifests no compensating rural characteristics".

=== The Muldoon years, 1975–1984 ===
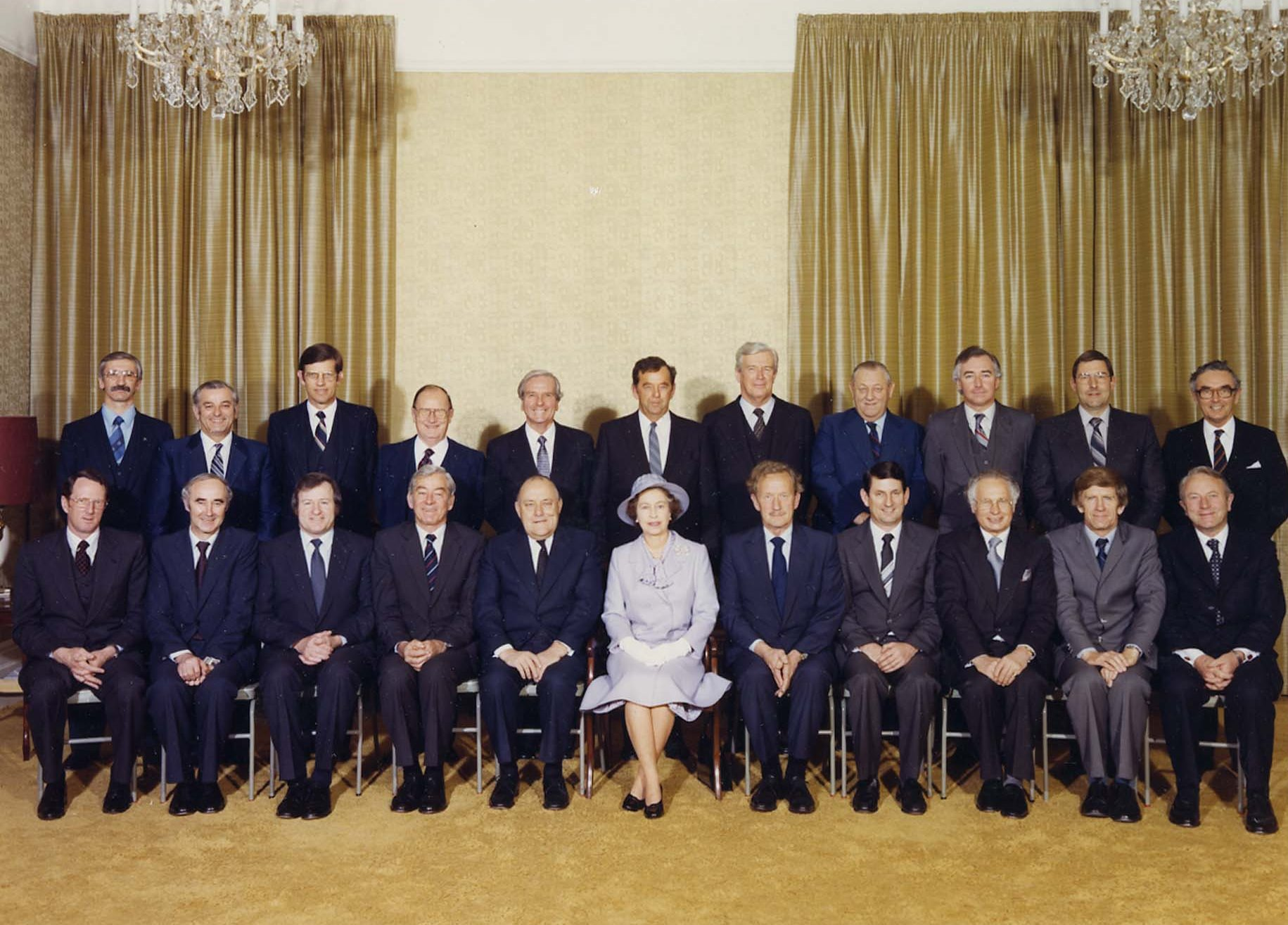
Elizabeth II and Muldoon's Cabinet, taken during the Queen's 1981 visit to New Zealand

The country's economy suffered in the aftermath of the 1973 global energy crisis and the loss of New Zealand's biggest export market upon Britain's entry to the European Economic Community. Robert Muldoon, Prime Minister from 1975 to 1984, and his Third National Government responded to the crises of the 1970s by attempting to preserve the New Zealand of the 1950s. He attempted to maintain New Zealand's "cradle to the grave" welfare state, which dated to 1935. The Muldoon Government sought to give retirees 80% of the current wage, which would require large-scale borrowing; critics said it would bankrupt the Treasury. In response to the second oil shock (petrol shortage) in 1979, the government introduced carless days for motor vehicles; however this proved ineffective. The oil crisis increased inflation which was exacerbated by a boom in commodity prices. Muldoon's response to the crisis also involved imposing a total freeze on wages, prices, interest rates and dividends across the national economy.

Muldoon's conservatism and antagonistic style exacerbated an atmosphere of conflict in New Zealand, most violently expressed during the 1981 Springbok Tour. In the 1984 elections Labour promised to calm down the increasing tensions, while making no specific promises; it scored a landslide victory.

However, Muldoon's government was not entirely backward looking. Some innovations did take place, for example the Closer Economic Relations (CER) free-trade programme with Australia to liberalise trade, starting in 1982. The aim of total free trade between the two countries was achieved in 1990, five years ahead of schedule.

=== The radical 1980s reforms ===
In 1984, the Fourth Labour Government, led by David Lange, was elected amid a constitutional and economic crisis. The crisis led the incoming government to review New Zealand's constitutional structures, which resulted in the Constitution Act 1986. In power from 1984 to 1990, the Labour government launched a major programme of restructuring the economy, radically reducing the role of government. A political scientist reports:

Between 1984 and 1993, New Zealand underwent radical economic reform, moving from what had probably been the most protected, regulated and state-dominated system of any capitalist democracy to an extreme position at the open, competitive, free-market end of the spectrum.

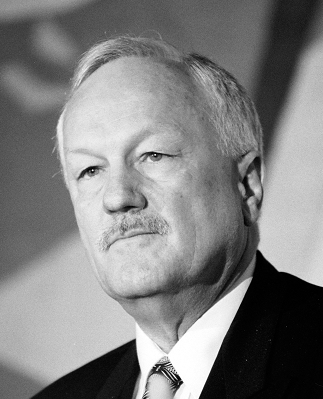
Roger Douglas, the architect of New Zealand's 1980s neo-liberal reform programme

The economic reforms were led by Roger Douglas, finance minister from 1984 to 1988. Dubbed Rogernomics, it was a rapid programme of deregulation and public-asset sales. Subsidies to farmers and consumers were phased out. High finance was partly deregulated. Restrictions on foreign exchange were relaxed and the dollar was allowed to float and seek its natural level on the world market. The tax on high incomes was cut in half from 65% to 33%. The shares exchange entered a bubble, which then burst, with the total value of shares falling from $50 billion in 1987 to $15 billion in 1991; at one point the crash was "the worst in world". Economic growth fell from 2% a year to 1%. Douglas's reforms resembled the contemporaneous policies of Margaret Thatcher in Britain and Ronald Reagan in the United States.

Strong criticism of Rogernomics came from the left, especially from Labour's traditional trade union support-base; Lange broke with Douglas's policies in 1987; both men were forced out and Labour was in confusion.

In keeping with the mood of the 1980s the government sponsored liberal policies and initiatives in a number of social areas; this included Homosexual Law Reform, the introduction of 'no-fault divorce', reduction in the gender pay gap and the drafting of a Bill of Rights. Immigration policy was liberalised, allowing an influx of immigrants from Asia; previously most immigrants to New Zealand had been European and especially British. The Treaty of Waitangi Amendment Act 1985 enabled the Waitangi Tribunal to investigate claims of breaches of the Treaty of Waitangi going back to 1840, and to settle grievances.

The Fourth Labour Government revolutionised New Zealand's foreign policy, making the country a nuclear-free zone and effectively withdrawing from the ANZUS alliance. The French intelligence service's sinking of the Rainbow Warrior, and the diplomatic ramifications following the incident, did much to promote the anti-nuclear stance as an important symbol of New Zealand's national identity.

In the 1980s, immigration from the British Isles declined, while Australia became the largest contributor to New Zealand's migrant flows in both directions. By the end of the decade New Zealand faced a net annual loss of over 30,000 people, with nearly 60% – particularly many young Māori – moving to Australia.

=== Continuing reform under National ===
Voters unhappy with the rapid speed and far-reaching extent of reforms elected a National government in 1990, led by Jim Bolger. However the new government continued the economic reforms of the previous Labour government, in what was known as Ruthanasia. Unhappy with what seemed to be a pattern of governments failing to reflect the mood of the electorate, New Zealanders in 1992 and 1993 voted to change the electoral system to mixed-member proportional (MMP), a form of proportional representation. New Zealand's first MMP election was held in 1996. Following the election National was returned to power in coalition with the New Zealand First party.

With the end of the Cold War in 1991, the nation's foreign policy turned increasingly to issues of its nuclear-free status and other military issues, its adjustment to neoliberalism in international trade relations, and its involvement in humanitarian, environmental and other matters of international diplomacy.

During the 1990s, immigration to New Zealand from Asia sharply increased – particularly from Hong Kong, Taiwan and South Korea – following the 1991 introduction of a points-based immigration system. It was this immigration that gave the anti-immigration New Zealand First Party its "Asian invasion" slogan for the 1996 election.

== 21st century ==
In the 21st century, international tourism was a major contributor to the New Zealand economy, until it was brought almost to a halt by the COVID-19 pandemic in 2020, and the service sector more generally has grown. Meanwhile, the traditional agricultural exports of meat, dairy and wool have been supplemented by other products such as fruit, wine and timber as the economy has diversified.

=== 2000s and 2010s ===
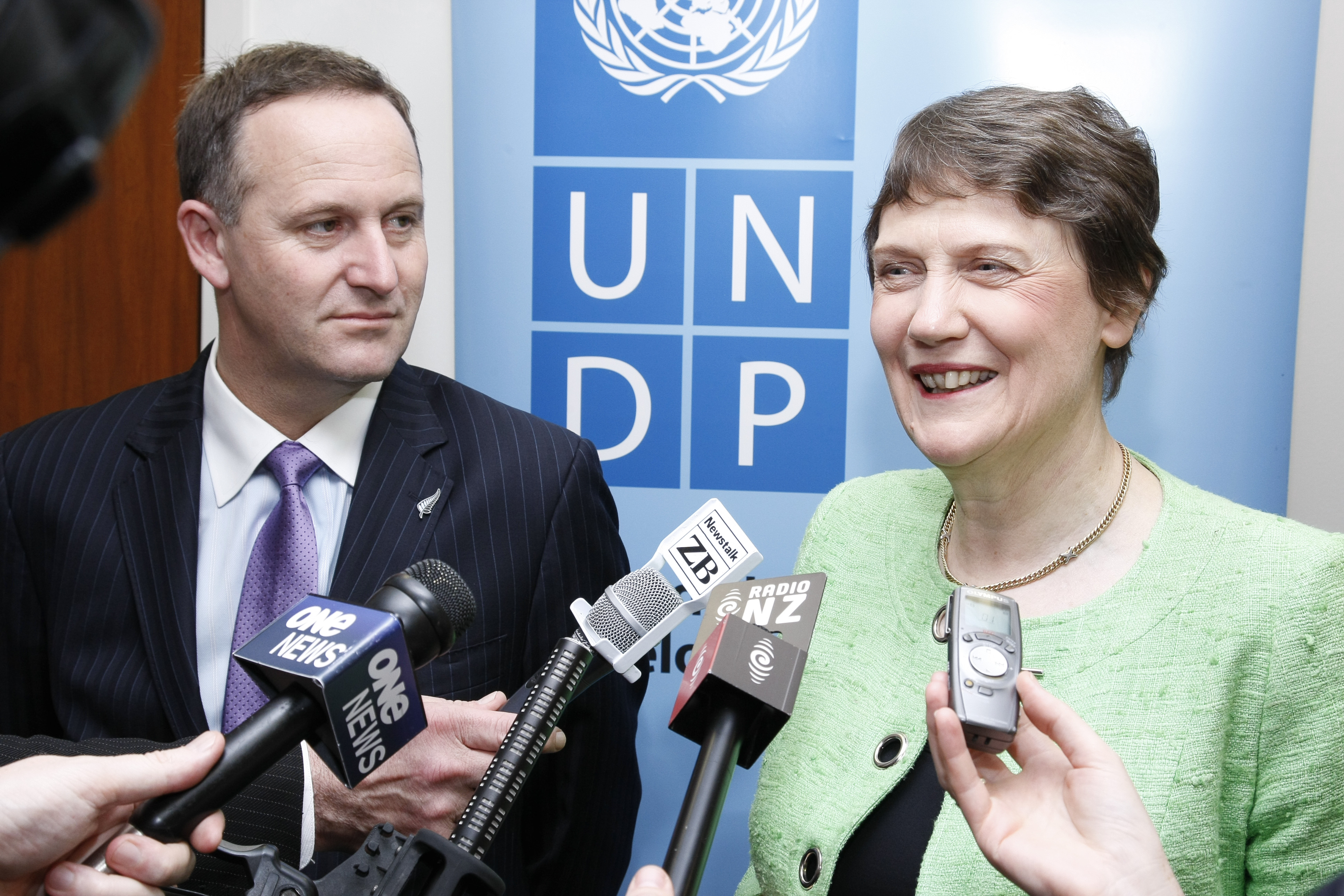
Prime Ministers John Key and Helen Clark

The Fifth Labour Government led by Helen Clark was formed following the December 1999 election. In power for nine years, it maintained most of the previous governments' economic reforms – restricting government intervention in the economy much more so than previous governments – while putting more emphasis on social policy and outcomes. For example, employment law was modified to give more protection to workers, and the student loan system was changed to eliminate interest payments for New Zealand resident students and graduates.

New Zealand retains strong but informal links to Britain, with many young New Zealanders travelling to Britain for their "OE" (overseas experience) due to favourable working visa arrangements with Britain. Despite New Zealand's immigration liberalisation in the 1980s, Britons are still the largest group of migrants to New Zealand, due in part to recent immigration law changes that privilege fluent speakers of English. One constitutional link to Britain remains – New Zealand's head of state, the King in Right of New Zealand, is a British resident. However, British imperial honours were discontinued in 1996, the governor-general has taken a more active role in representing New Zealand overseas, and appeals from the Court of Appeal to the Judicial Committee of the Privy Council were replaced by a local Supreme Court of New Zealand in 2003. There is public debate about whether New Zealand should become a republic, with public sentiment divided on the issue.

Foreign policy has been essentially independent since the mid-1980s. Under Prime Minister Clark, foreign policy reflected the priorities of liberal internationalism. She stressed the promotion of democracy and human rights, the strengthening of the role of the United Nations, the advancement of anti-militarism and disarmament, and the encouragement of free trade. She sent troops to the War in Afghanistan, but did not contribute combat troops to the Iraq War, although some medical and engineering units were sent.

John Key led the National Party to victory in the November 2008. Key became Prime Minister of the Fifth National Government, which entered government at the beginning of the late-2000s recession. In February 2011, a major earthquake in Christchurch, the nation's third-largest urban area, significantly affected the national economy and the government formed the Canterbury Earthquake Recovery Authority in response. In foreign policy, Key announced the withdrawal of New Zealand Defence Force personnel from their deployment in the war in Afghanistan, and signed the Wellington Declaration with the United States.

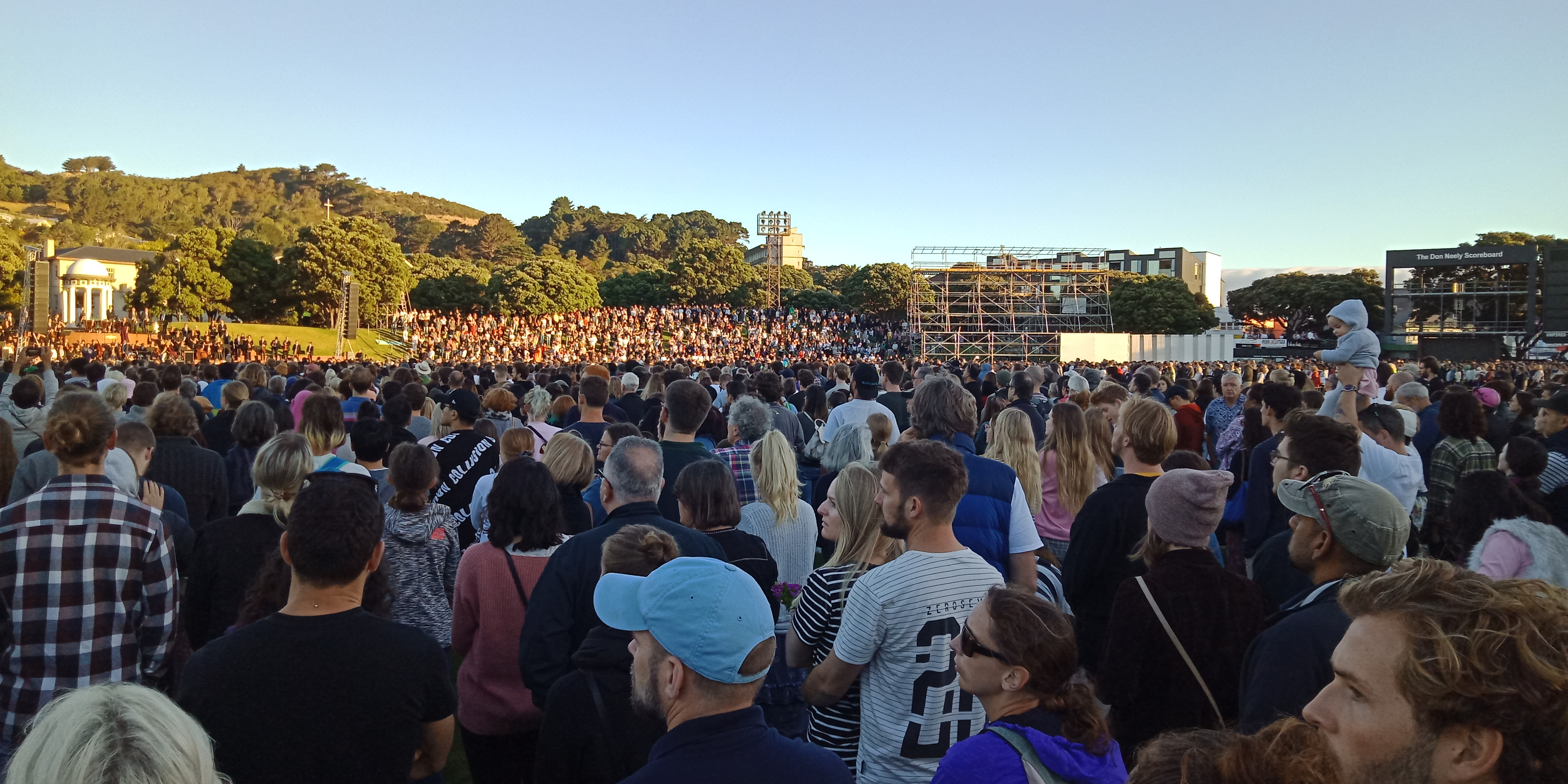
Vigil in Wellington for the victims of the Christchurch mosques attacks

A Labour-led coalition Government led by Left-leaning Prime Minister Jacinda Ardern was formed in October 2017. Among other issues, it hoped to tackle a burgeoning housing shortage crisis in New Zealand.

On 15 March 2019, a lone terrorist shooter attacked two mosques during Friday Prayer, killing 51 people and injuring 40 more, and live streamed the attack. Prime Minister Jacinda Ardern, who referred to the attack as "one of New Zealand's darkest days", led efforts to support the Muslim community and ban semi-automatic centerfire rifles.

=== 2020s ===
The COVID-19 pandemic first reached New Zealand in early 2020 with widespread economic, societal, and political consequences. In March 2020, borders and entry ports of New Zealand were closed to all non-residents. A national lockdown was imposed by the government, beginning on 25 March 2020, with all restrictions (except border controls) lifted on 9 June. The government's elimination approach has been praised internationally. The government planned a response to the projected severe economic consequences of the pandemic.

The 2020 general election resulted in a victory for the Labour Party—the first outright majority for a single party since the introduction of MMP. The Labour party entered into cooperation agreement with the Green Party. During the 2020 election there were two referendums on the ballot. The first, which would have legalised recreational cannabis in New Zealand, was narrowly rejected; the second, which would legalise voluntary euthanasia, passed.

Prime Minister Jacinda Ardern resigned in January 2023, being replaced by Chris Hipkins, who led the Labour Party into the 2023 general elections. On 25 January 2023, Prime Minister Chris Hipkins and his Deputy Prime Minister, Carmel Sepuloni, the first person of Pacific Islander descent to hold the role, were sworn in.

In October 2023, the centre-right National Party, led by Christopher Luxon, won enough votes to form a coalition government.

== See also ==
- Aotearoa New Zealand's histories
- Bibliography of New Zealand history
- Early New Zealand Books – 260 searchable books 1805–1870
- Europeans in Oceania
- History of Oceania
- Military history of New Zealand
- Natural history of New Zealand
- Political history of New Zealand
- Timeline of New Zealand history
