= Sealed orders (disambiguation) =

Sealed orders are orders given to the commanding officer of a ship or squadron that are sealed up.

Sealed orders may also refer to:

- Sealed Orders (book), a 1972 autobiography
- "Sealed Orders" (Doctor Who), an unmade television serial
- "Sealed Orders" (short story), a 1962 science fiction short story
