= Bank of New Zealand =

Financial institution in New Zealand

- Logo used since 2010
- Type: Subsidiary
- Industry: financial sector
- Founded: 2 July 1861; 165 years ago
- Headquarters: Auckland, New Zealand
- Key people: Dan Huggins (CEO)
- Products: Banking services, loans and saving services
- Number of employees: 5,000 (2013)
- Parent: National Australia Bank
- Rating: AA− (S&P)
- Website: www.bnz.co.nz

Bank of New Zealand (BNZ) is one of the four largest banks in New Zealand. Established in 1861, it provides retail, business, and institutional banking services through a nationwide branch and digital network. Since 1992, BNZ has operated as a subsidiary of the Australia-based National Australia Bank (NAB), while retaining a New Zealand board of directors. Headquartered in Auckland, the bank has played a central role in the country’s financial system, including periods of government ownership during the late 20th century. Today, BNZ remains a major participant in New Zealand’s banking sector, with a market share comparable to its three main competitors ANZ, ASB, and Westpac.

The Bank of New Zealand in Australia (BNZA) is a former entity, now owned by NAB.

== History ==
The original Bank of New Zealand logo used for 147 years until 1 October 2008

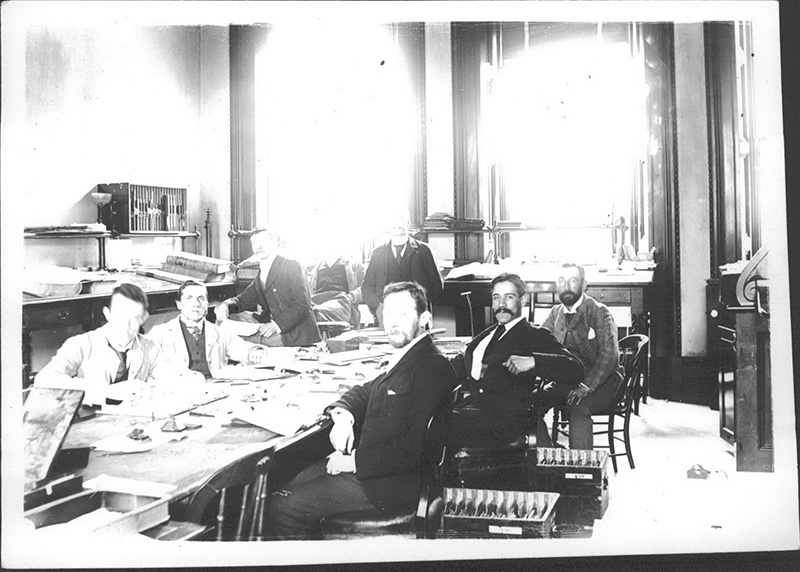
The General Manager's office of the Bank of New Zealand Queen Street branch in 1894

The Bank of New Zealand was formed as a private company and incorporated by the New Zealand Bank Act 1861, which created the company and authorises it to issue banknotes. The Bank of New Zealand's first office opened in Auckland in October 1861, followed shortly afterwards by the first branch in Dunedin in December 1861.

In 1862, branches opened in Wellington, Christchurch, and London. The bank gained the banking account of the New Zealand Government from the Union Bank of Australia, and became an agent to raise debt in the United Kingdom for the government. In the 1860s and 1870s capital was brought into New Zealand by the government and others. There was plenty of employment, development moved quickly and very good prospects brought property prices to high values.

In the 1880s prices of staple products fell very low, the rabbit pest cut wool production, and the government cut expenditure on public works by 75 per cent. Land fell to half its former value and was impossible to realise, many runholders and businessmen were ruined and the working classes were unable to purchase goods or pay their debts. There was no dairying or frozen meat industry. Investors withdrew their capital. The export of frozen meat began in the 1880s refer Canterbury Lamb and dairy products soon followed see Anchor butter. In June 1894 the BNZ saved by legislation. In 1895, the BNZ took over the Colonial Bank of New Zealand, which was in crisis.

=== 20th century timeline ===
- 1940: £1 million interest‑free loan provided to the Government as a war contribution; the number of women employed by the company rises from 74 to more than 700 by 1945.
- 1943: Mobile branch opened in a caravan for American servicemen; night banking introduced in Auckland and Wellington.
- 1944: Personal loans department opened; Government announces intention to nationalise the bank.
- 1945: Nash Government introduces the Bank of New Zealand Bill; once passed, the Government pays £7,933,000 in cash, transferable stock, and tax‑free stock to the Bank’s 8,500 shareholders for their shares, with an average holding of 495 shares.
- 1966: First computer purchased, an IBM 360/30 with a 16k memory; Databank Systems Ltd set up in 1967 with the National Bank of New Zealand; the other three trading banks join in 1968.
- 1978: Visa debit card introduced.
- 1980: Visa credit cards introduced.
- 1984: BNZ Centre completed on Willis Street, Wellington.
- 1985: Eftpos introduced through petrol stations in a pilot programme.
- 1987: Bank floated on sharemarket with a 15% stock offering.
- 1989: Government reduces its share to 51% by selling 34%, with 30% sold to Capital Markets Ltd, and the remainder to the general public
- 1990: Government bail-out of $380 million to avoid collapse. Incoming prime minister Jim Bolger was told on the Sunday after the 1990 election that the bank "has to report by Friday and if it’s not given support by then, it will collapse" (because of Australian loans). It held "40 per cent of the commercial paper in New Zealand. So if it collapsed, half of New Zealand’s companies would have collapsed".

The Bank of New Zealand logo used between 2008 and 2010

- 1992: National Australia Bank (NAB) purchased the BNZ, which becomes a subsidiary of the Australian bank, but retains local governance with a New Zealand board of directors.
- 1992: First call centre opened in Auckland.
- 1998: Head office moves to Auckland.
- 1999: BNZ launched internet banking.
- 1999: BNZ Private Banking network launched.

At some point, the business entity known as 'Bank of New Zealand in Australia' (BNZA) was absorbed by NAB.

=== 21st century ===
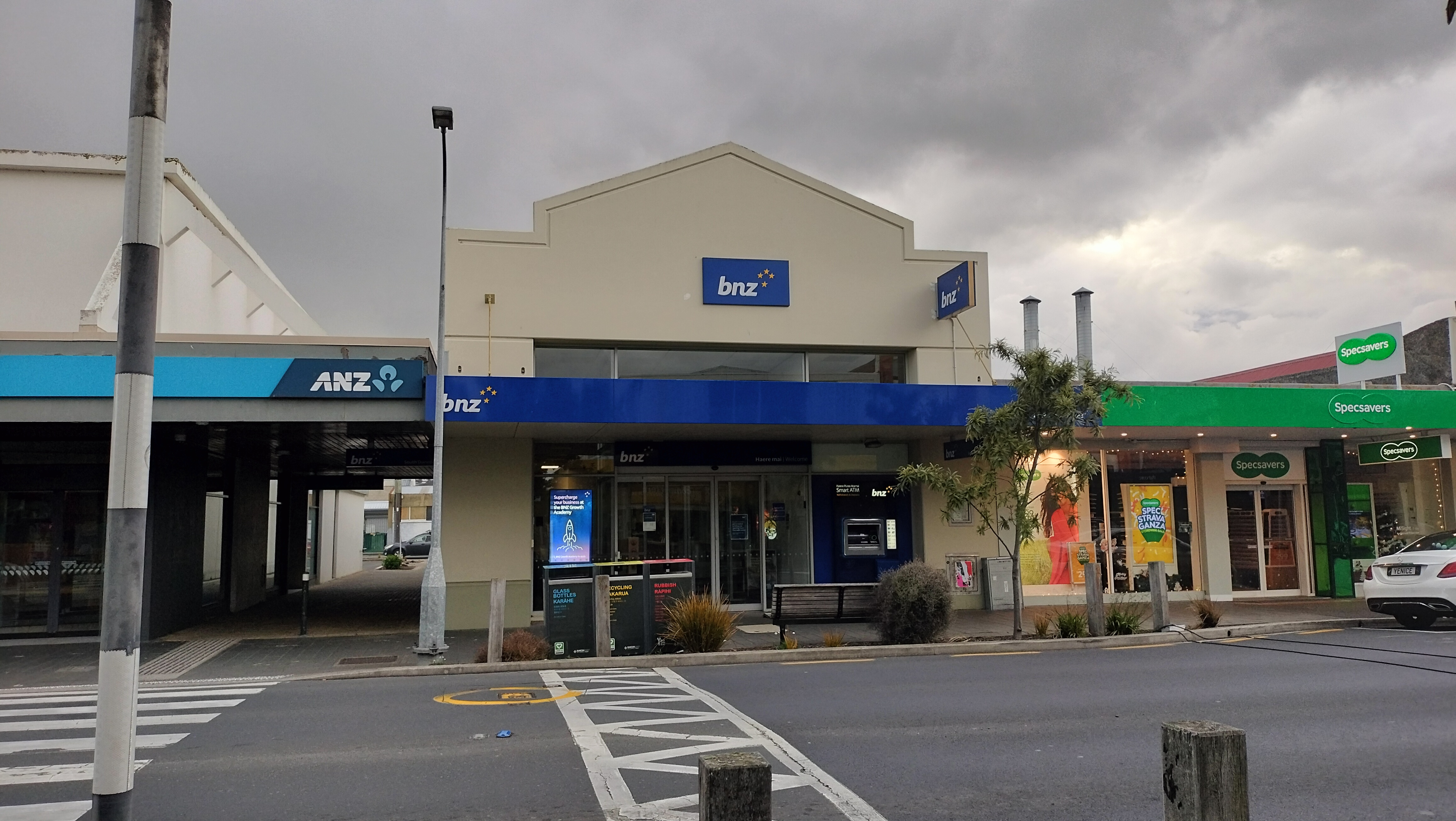
BNZ branch in South Dunedin

In 2000, there were 192 branches and 5562 staff.

On 1 October 2008 the bank rebranded itself as "BNZ", with a change in logo and colours.

As of 2013 the bank employed over 5,000 people in New Zealand.

In 2020, BNZ announced the closure of 38 branches over the following seven months as a result of the economic effects of the COVID-19 pandemic in New Zealand.

As of June 2022, BNZ is the second largest bank operating in New Zealand, with a market share of 19.1%.

In mid-June 2026, the Financial Markets Authority fined BNZ $2.6 million for misleading customers about how interest was calculated on some non-profit accounts.

== Core business functions ==
=== Retail banking ===
For retail customers, Bank of New Zealand offers a range of products and services that include savings and investments, home loans, credit cards, personal loans, insurance and international and migrant banking. Customers are able to bank using telephone banking, internet banking or by visiting one of 180 branches around New Zealand.

=== Business ===
Business banking at Bank of New Zealand has been branded BNZ Partners and provides a full range of banking services for small, medium and large businesses.

Services include transactional bank accounts, investments, loans and finance, card and payment, insurance and international banking services for businesses dealing with exports, imports and foreign exchange.

Bank of New Zealand’s business banking division provides banking staff with specialist knowledge of various industry sectors consisting of agribusiness, medical, professional, property, not-for-profit, franchising and iwi.

=== Institutional ===
Bank of New Zealand’s institutional banking division provides wholesale banking services for large corporate, financial institutions and government entities. These cover a wide range of sectors, including primary industries; manufacturing and retailing; energy; utilities; telecommunications and infrastructure; property; local government; health; and education. In December 2010, BNZ was appointed as lead arranger for the newly formed Auckland Council’s $600 million syndicated bank loan facility. In June 2010, BNZ was awarded the contract to provide the Auckland Council with comprehensive transactional services and over-the counter services.

== Operations ==
Main management and administration functions for Bank of New Zealand are located in Wellington and Auckland and the bank operates a nationwide network of 180 retail stores and business centres (branded as Partner Centres).

== Sustainability ==
Bank of New Zealand became the first bank in New Zealand to become carbon neutral. The achievement was announced in September 2010 after a three-year initiative to reduce emissions through greater energy and vehicle efficiency, encouraging changed behaviour by employees at work and at home and through offsetting of unavoidable emissions by purchasing quality carbon credits. The most visible aspect of the initiative came through the construction of three brand new, energy efficient buildings to house the bulk of the company’s management and administration staff. Two of these building are located in the Auckland CBD, one at Quay Park and the other at 80 Queen Street. The third was the Harbour Quays complex on the Wellington waterfront, built in 2009 and demolished in 2019 after suffering damage in the 2016 Kaikōura earthquake. The Deloitte Centre at 80 Queen Street was tagged "the greenest building in the land" after it became the first building in New Zealand to receive three Five Green Stars awards. The BNZ Quay Park building was nominated for a BeST Design Award in 2008 for Offices and Workplace Environments.

== Arms ==
Coat of arms of Bank of New Zealand
Notes The arms of BNZ consist of: Adopted 9 July 1954 Crest On a Wreath of the Colours (Azure and Or), standing on a Mount of earth with ferns proper growing thereon, a Kiwi Or. Escutcheon Azure, within two chevonels Or, five bezants, in chief three Mullets chevronwise and one in the base Argent.

== Litigation ==
- Bank of New Zealand v Greenwood – 1984 New Zealand legal case
- Shivas v Bank of New Zealand
- Elders Pastoral Limited v Bank of New Zealand
- Saunders & Co v Bank of New Zealand
