= Saunders & Co v Bank of New Zealand =

- Court: High Court of New Zealand
- Full case name: Saunders & Co v Bank of New Zealand (First Defendant) ... Lane Neave (Fifth Defendant), Mr England (Sixth Defendant)
- Decided: 14 November 2001
- Citation: [2002] 2 NZLR 270

Court membership
- Judge sitting: O'Regan J

Keywords
- negligence

Saunders & Co v Bank of New Zealand [2002] 2 NZLR 270 is a cited case in New Zealand regarding claims in tort for negligent misstatements.

== Background ==
Saunders & Co was a Christchurch-based law firm that employed legal executive Karen Barr as its Trust Manager from 1993-1999. In 1999, Saunders discovered Barr had over the years embezzled money from their trust accounts, what a Serious Fraud Office investigation stated was in excess of $2.693 million.

Barr was subsequently charged, convicted and imprisoned for these offences, as well as being declared bankrupt.

Saunders later sued multiple parties that they claimed were responsible for the loss, including an investigator Mr England, and his employer Lane Neave (solicitors) appointed by the New Zealand Law Society for a special investigation, in both tort and in contract.

== Held ==
The claim against the investigator and Lane Neave was dismissed.

Footnote: This case is distinguished from Stringer v Peat Marwick Mitchell & Co and Price Waterhouse v Kwan because in those cases they involved an auditor appointed by the Law Society, whereas in this case it was an investigator appointed by the Law Society.
