= Bank of New Zealand v Greenwood =

1984 New Zealand legal case

- Court: High Court of New Zealand
- Full case name: Bank of New Zealand v Greenwood
- Citation: [1984] 1 NZLR 525
- Transcript: High Court judgment

Court membership
- Judge sitting: Hardie Boys J

Keywords
- negligence

Bank of New Zealand v Greenwood [1984] 1 NZLR 525 is a cited case in New Zealand regarding land based nuisance claims in tort.

== Background ==
Reflection of sunlight from Greenwood's architecturally designed glass veranda caused discomfort to people working in the Bank of New Zealand building opposite it. Greenwood refused to take steps to rectify this, as they claimed that sunlight was not an actionable claim in nuisance.

== Held ==
The court ruled that the reflection of sunlight is an actionable claim in nuisance, but instead of making Greenwood remove the offending veranda which would have cost $20,000, it ordered that Greenwood pay for the installation of blinds at the BNZ building.
