= Shivas v Bank of New Zealand =

- Court: High Court of New Zealand
- Full case name: Gillian Shivas & John Falloon v Bank of New Zealand
- Decided: 14 November 1989
- Citation: [1990] 2 NZLR 327
- Transcript: judgment

Court membership
- Judge sitting: Tipping J

Keywords
- duress

Shivas v Bank of New Zealand [1990] 2 NZLR 327 is an important case in New Zealand regarding duress.

== Background ==
Mrs Shivas was a trustee of a family trust established by her husband Mr Shivas. Mr Shivas also ran a separate company involved in selling airplanes. As a result of the company experiencing financial difficulties and being unable to service its debts, the principal creditor, the BNZ, asked for the company to provide extra security, namely for the family trust to give a guarantee over the company's debts as well as grant a mortgage over the Shivas family home.

The trustees, reluctant to give such a guarantee, which included the family home, ultimately gave the guarantee after the BNZ said they would appoint receivers to the company if the guarantee was not given. The trustees had access to independent legal advice at the time.

Unfortunately, these guarantees only delayed the inevitable, as 18 months later, the company was placed into receivership, with the receivers seeking to enforce the trust's guarantee as well as the mortgage over the family home.

The trustees tried to set aside the guarantees on the grounds of duress, even though they had not raised this issue once with the BNZ in the 18 months that had passed since it was signed.

The trustees got an interim injunction in the meantime, preventing the BNZ enforcing the guarantee.

== Decision ==
The court ruled that the trustees did not have to give the guarantee at the time, as they could alternatively have refused to grant the guarantee. The BNZ's threat of placing the company into receivership was held to not be illegitimate pressure. The judge also noted that the plaintiff did not protest duress at the time of signing, nor during the following two years. As a result, the court held that the trust's guarantee was enforceable.
