= Stringer v Peat Marwick Mitchell & Co =

- Court: High Court of New Zealand
- Full case name: Stringer v Peat Marwick Mitchell & Co
- Citation: [2000] 1 NZLR 450

Court membership
- Judge sitting: Chisholm J

Keywords
- negligence

Stringer v Peat Marwick Mitchell & Co [2000] 1 NZLR 450 is a cited case in New Zealand regarding liability for negligent misstatements

== Background ==
Stringer was a partner at a law firm where it was discovered that a fellow partner had embezzled 1 million dollars from the firm, which had gone unnoticed by the auditors Peat Marwick. Stringer sued the auditors for negligence for the loss.

Peat Marwick argued that they were hired by the New Zealand Law Society and not by the law firm itself, although the law firm did pay for their audit fees.

== Result ==
The court held that despite the primary purpose of the auditing was to protect the firms clients, they were also protecting the partnership's interests as well, meaning that they were liable for the partners losses from the fraud. The court did say however, that they could possibly mitigate the amount of damages through contributory negligence, if the partners were negligent as well.
