= Elders Pastoral Limited v Bank of New Zealand =

- Court: Privy Council
- Full case name: Elders Pastoral Limited v Bank of New Zealand
- Decided: 18 June 1990
- Citation: [1990] NZPC 3; [1990] UKPC 29; [1990] 3 NZLR 129; [1990] 1 WLR 1090; (1990) 2 PRNZ 333
- Transcript: judgment

Court membership
- Judges sitting: Lord Bridge of Harwich, Lord Templeman, Lord Griffiths, Lord Ackner, Lord Goff of Chieveley

Elders Pastoral Limited v Bank of New Zealand [1990] NZPC 3; [1990] UKPC 29; [1990] 3 NZLR 129; [1990] 1 WLR 1090; (1990) 2 PRNZ 333 is a cited case in New Zealand case law regarding constructive trusts.

== Background ==
In 1987, farmer William Gunn granted the Bank of New Zealand a security over his livestock, making all proceeds of any livestock sales to be payable to the bank. However, the security did allow the farmer to sell livestock during "ordinary course of business".

The following year however, Gunn sold 3,081 lambs via his livestock agent Elders Pastoral, later not only deducting their normal commission for the sale, also deducted the bulk of the remaining proceeds to offset other monies owed by the farmer to Elders.

On discovery of this development, the bank advised Elders that these monies were payable to them under their security, adding that the money from the sale should be held as a constructive trust for the bank.

== Held ==
The court held that the money was to be held as a constructive trust for the Bank of New Zealand.
