= Sealed orders =

Secretive orders given to naval commanders

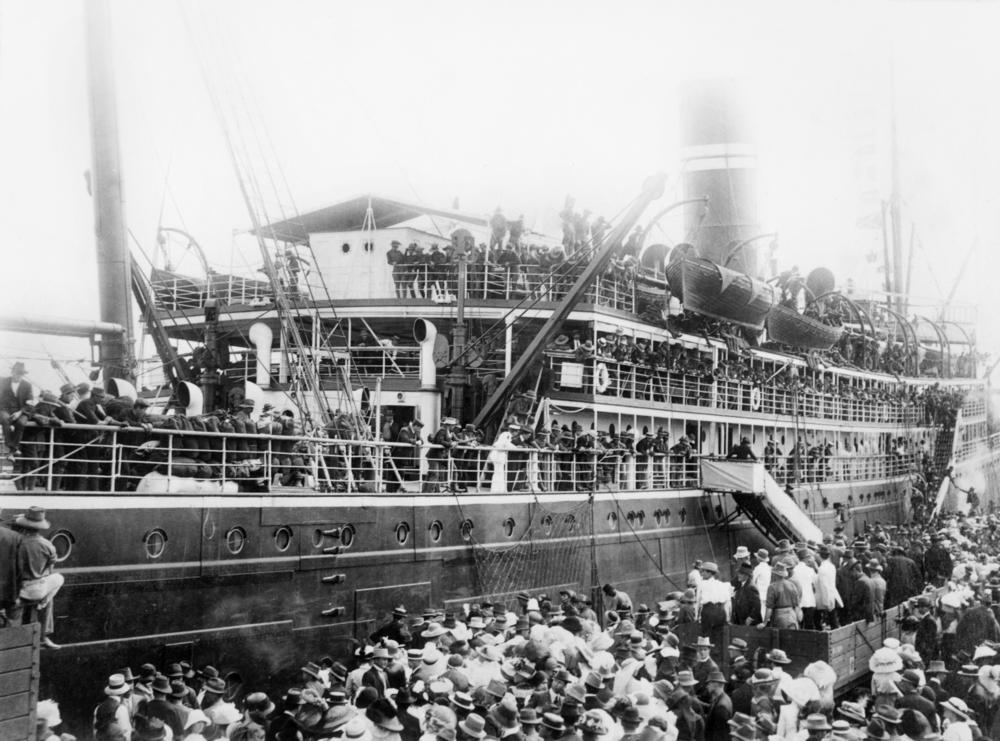
Australian troops embarking in Queensland in 1914. After assembling at Thursday Island and Port Moresby, their sealed orders directed them to capture German New Guinea.

Sealed orders refer to directives presented to the commanding officer of a ship or squadron that are sealed at time of receipt. Officers are required to keep the orders sealed until at sea so as to maintain operational secrecy, especially in time of war.
