= Philip Chronican =

Australian businessman (born 1956)

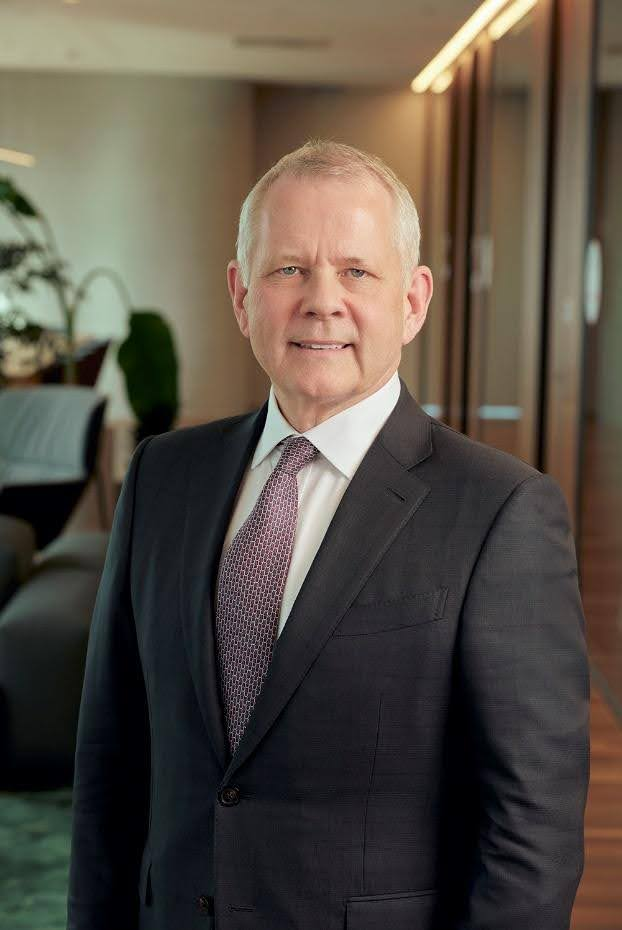

Chair of the National Australia Bank
- Incumbent
- Assumed office 2019
- Preceded by: Ken Henry

Personal details
- Born: 10 August 1956 (age 70) Dunedin, New Zealand
- Education: University of Otago

Philip Chronican (born 10 August 1956) is a New Zealand-born businessman who is currently Non-Executive Director and Chair of National Australia Bank and a Director at Woolworths Group.

== Early life and education ==
Philip Chronican was born in Dunedin, New Zealand. Chronican has a BCom (Hons) degree in economics from the University of Otago and an MBA from the International Institute for Management Development.

== Career ==
Chronican entered finance in the New Zealand Treasury. Chronican spent the next 27 years of his career at Westpac, holding executive positions such as CFO and head of institutional banking. During this time, Chronican completed his MBA and moved to Australia with his then wife Leanne.

In September 2009, Chronican left Westpac and joined ANZ to run its Retail and Commercial Business. In this role he had oversight of ANZ's businesses across the country, including direct responsibility for retail and commercial banking in Australia. After decades as a banker, Chronican stepped down from ANZ in early 2015, with plans to pursue a non-executive career.

In 2016, Chronican became a non-executive director at National Australia Bank, holding positions on several committees including the risk committee.

Following the resignations of Ken Henry and Andrew Thorburn as a result of the Royal Commission into Misconduct in the Banking and Superannuation industry, Chronican acted as interim Group CEO from March to November 2019.

In November 2019, Chronican became Chair of National Australia Bank. In this role, Chronican has taken an active and public role in advocating for greater transparency and ethics in banking and promoting workforce diversity. He has also taken a strong interest in climate change and its impact on customers and the economy.

In October 2021, Chronican was appointed as an Independent non-executive director of Woolworths Group.

Chronican is also Chair of the Westmead Institute for Medical Research and was a Director of the New South Wales Treasury Corporation.
