= Cameron Clyne =

Australian businessman (born 1968)

Cameron Clyne (born 21 March 1968) is an Australian businessman, who served Group CEO of the National Australia Bank Group.

== Education ==
Clyne earned a Bachelor of Arts from Sydney University.

== Career ==
From 2005 to 2009, Clyne served as president of Rugby Australia.

In January 2009, Clyne became the executive Director & Managing Director and Group CEO of the National Australia Bank Group. Clyne retired in August 2014 and was succeeded by Andrew Thorburn.

He was chairman of the Australian Rugby Union from December 2015 to February 2020.
