= Four pillars policy =

Australian Government economic policy

The four pillars policy is an Australian Government policy to maintain the separation of the four largest banks in Australia by rejecting any merger or acquisition between the four major banks. The policy, rather than formal regulation, first articulated in 1990, reflects the competitive concerns of more concentration as well as the broad political unpopularity of further bank mergers. A number of economically liberalist commentators have argued that the "four pillars" policy is built upon economic fallacies and works against Australia's better interests.

The top four banking groups in Australia ranked by market capitalisation at share prices at 5 June 2021:

Rank	Company	Market capitalisation (2021)	Cash earnings (2021)	Total assets (2021)
1	Commonwealth Bank	$179.56 billion	$3.89 billion	$960.751 billion
2	Westpac	$97.22 billion	$3.44 billion	$901.329 billion
3	National Australia Bank	$89.46 billion	$1.65 billion	$766.063 billion
4	Australia & New Zealand Banking Group	$81.87 billion	$2.99 billion	$642.298 billion

By market capitalisation, the Commonwealth Bank and Westpac are usually the two biggest companies on the Australian Securities Exchange and the big four banks make up a quarter of the ASX200.

== History ==
In 1990, the then Labor Treasurer Paul Keating adopted a policy, originally called "six pillars" — which covered the big four banks (Commonwealth Bank, Westpac, National Australia Bank, Australia & New Zealand Banking Group) and two insurers (AMP and National Mutual) — that further mergers of these institutions would be rejected. It was articulated in the context of a proposed merger between ANZ and National Mutual. Keating believed this arrangement would ensure a competitive banking market.

In 1997, leading business figure Stan Wallis produced a report of his inquiry into Australia's financial system, entitled the Final Report of the Financial System Inquiry and commonly referred to as "the Wallis report." Wallis recommended that the "Four Pillars" model be dismantled, to leave the banks subject to the same merger competition tests as other businesses. In response, the then Coalition Treasurer Peter Costello's removed the pillar status of the two insurers (National Mutual had by that time already been acquired by AXA), but the ban on mergers of the remaining four banks was retained, with the rider that none of them were considered immune from foreign takeover. With the change of government, new Treasurer Wayne Swan stated in 2008 that the Labor government has no plans to dismantle the four pillars policy.

== Legal and policy analysis ==
The four pillars policy has not prevented the four major banks from acquiring smaller competitors. For example, in 2000, the Commonwealth Bank acquired the Colonial Group, which had emerged as a major bank–insurance combine in the 1990s, after the Colonial Mutual insurance group took over State Bank of New South Wales in 1994. The Commonwealth Bank also acquired the State Bank of Victoria in 1990 and Bankwest in 2008. Westpac acquired Challenge Bank in 1995, Bank of Melbourne in 1997, and St George Bank in 2008.

In 2017, Peter Costello said that the advantage of having big banks under the four pillars policy was stability, which he attributed to Australia faring well during the 2008 financial crisis.

== Criticism ==
The policy has been criticised for being anti-competitive by ensuring that the four major banks are immune from takeover by the most likely suitors. At the same time, it is credited with insulating the banks from the 2008 financial crisis. The major banks have criticised the policy on the basis that limiting the size of Australian banks makes them less internationally competitive.

== See also ==
- Banking in Australia
- Big Five (banks), Canada – unofficial policy since the mid-1990s forbids mergers among them
- Financial regulation in Australia
- Royal Commission into Misconduct in the Banking, Superannuation and Financial Services Industry
- Too big to fail
