= Regional Australia Bank =

Bank in New South Wales, Australia

- Formerly: Community Mutual Group
- Type: Mutual bank
- Industry: Financial Services
- Founded: 1969
- Headquarters: Armidale, New South Wales, Australia
- Number of locations: 36
- Products: Banking, financial and related services
- Website: regionalaustraliabank.com.au

Regional Australia Bank is a member owned bank with roots in regional New South Wales and head office located in Armidale, Australia.

== History ==
Regional Australia Bank's beginnings started with New England Staff Credit Union at The University of New England in 1969. Following mergers with Peel Valley Credit Union in 2004, Orana Credit Union in 2008 and Hunter Mutual in 2010, they became New England Mutual, Orana Mutual and Hunter Mutual in the relevant geographical areas, falling under the overarching brand of the Community Mutual Group. In 2016 the trading name was changed to Regional Australia Bank.

== Rural Banking in Australia's History ==
Banking in Australia in the 20th century can be divided into pre and post the 1980s deregulation. The climate of the financial services industry before the 1980s infamous financial deregulation phenomenon was characterised by constant change of policy and regulatory constraints. As open market forces became more intrusive within local industries, governing bodies attempted to fix exchange rates and interest rates, forcing banks to adopt centralised approaches to financing loans and offering financial services. The central bank of Australia offered a figurehead role in the financial stability of banks and businesses. However, the plight of the Cold War incited the Australian government to solidify legislative reform regarding centralising the foreign exchange reserves and mandating private banks to hold a supply of local currency in reserves with the central bank. At this time, rural and regional banking was at a bare minimum, integrated into private and centralised banking. The rapid pace of change in the financial services industry did not offer extenuating opportunities for rural areas to develop financial independence and prosperity. Regional areas were not granted any specific or rigorous banking services unless they integrated into city regions for their business operations or headquarters. As a result, rural and regional areas in Australia during the 1950s to 1980s often operated within an archaic and outdated financial services model; based on city banks’ supply and a tedious integration of this financial support to regional areas utilising transportation systems established sporadically from mineral booms. Agricultural booms in the mid-20th century temporarily expanded regional populations and infrastructure, however the general trend for urbanisation to coastal regions, along with the deregulation of financial services industry left regional banking and finance at a loss for resources and government support, as the 'long boom' of employment and economic activity reached a post-war peak in city areas. From 1974 to 2006, large settlement changes to coastal regions underpinned significant changes to financial services around Australia, and in particular a divergence of economic focus away from regional Australia.

Since the 1980s, and the deregulation of the financial system, Australia's commercial banks have dominated the financial market, holding over 49% of financial assets and 93% of deposits by 1998. This financial regulation in Australia meant that the portion of financial institutions with mutual ownership structures dropped significantly from 10% to 1.6%. Regional Australia Bank is one of the three remaining institutions in Australia with a membership structure whereby joining the bank automatically allocates a member one share in Regional Australia Bank. The mass demutualisation of many banks was widespread and had vast financial repercussions. Banks that transitioned to a shareholder and investor-based structure were able to expand by gaining capital from external parties through a banking licence. At this time, the provision of services in regional and rural Australia was declining, as private sector corporations and government organisations withdrew key societal aspects such as banking branches, schools, hospitals, and police services "responded to commercial pressures from demographic changes". The consequences of such movements, from regional areas to coastal cities, has impacted the nature of rural banking in Australia. In particular, the online banking features of Australia's 'big four' banks has proven detrimental in expanding the number of branches across regional Australia. According to the 'big four's' published networks of branches, over 60% of branches located in regional Australia have closed since 1975, down from 2802 banks to just 1124 branches operating in May 2021. This geographical shift aligns with trends in urbanisation to coastal cities, however has meant that dozens of rural Australian towns such as Casterton, Drouin, Grenfell no longer have physical access to any financial or banking services, which has particularly negative consequences for Indigenous Australian communities (Westbury, N, 2004). Regional Australia Bank is one of few financial institutions continuing to operate branches in these regions within NSW.

== Growth of Regional Australia Bank ==
There is a notable distinction between a community bank and a regional bank. While a community bank is typically smaller and holds less than $10 billion in assets, regional banks are defined to hold between $10 and $100 billion in assets. While these distinctions can be made, rural, regional and community banking serve a similar purpose for individuals and consumers located out of metropolitan areas in Australia. Since its inception, Regional Australia Bank employs over 250 staff nationally and has established 36 branches across NSW, with its head office located in Armidale. Branch locations include Dubbo, Coonabarabran, Narromine, Manilla, Barraba as well as Moree. Most of Regional Australia Bank's branch locations are in communities with populations below 5,000 residents.

== Core Business Activities ==
The bank offers products such as home loans, car and personal loans, credit cards, insurance and financial advice to individuals. To business customers, it offersinvestment accounts, business loans and vehicle or equipment finance and insurance through selling Allianz products such as CTP green slips personal car and home insurance.

=== Community Partnership Program ===
The bank generates approximately $38 million in annual revenue and sponsors various organisations through their Community Partnership Program. This program entails customers electing a desired charity or organisation and Regional Australia Bank donating 0.75% of the customer's annual balance to the respective group. Within the 2021 financial year, the program has donated over $2 million to a range of organisations including Camp Quality, Ronald McDonald House, Cancer Council and Suicide Prevention Australia. The bank also donates to a range of charities specific to each of their rural and regional locations, supporting institutions such as local primary schools, women's societies, soccer programs for disabled children and scholarship funds for colleges and universities.

=== Sustainability ===
Regional Australia Bank has been awarded a Bronze Partner in the NSW Government's Sustainability Advantage program. The bank won Socially Responsible Mutual of the Year by Money Magazine in 2013 and 2014 and commits to making investments in various renewable energy sources. Regional Australia Bank also encourages sustainability of its members by pledging $1 to local Landcare initiatives for every member that transitions from paper statements to online versions. Additionally, the bank offers Sustainable home loans to members, whereby if individuals meet requirements such as grey water tanks and solar panels in their build, they are offered discounted interest rates on the loan.

== Marketing and Customer Demographics ==
Regional Australia Bank markets itself as a customer owned bank, meaning that its shareholders are also its member customers. This type of structure is commonly associated with a community bank, popular before the deregulation of the financial system in the 1970s in Australia.

Regional Australia Bank's 36 locations within NSW (2021) are spread mostly across north-western and western NSW. In these regions, the median age of the populations are approximately 43 years, compared to 36 years in major cities (Australian Bureau of Statistics Census of Population and Housing, 2016). This characteristic of older individuals in regional NSW means that Regional Australia Bank's customers are skewed towards retired or married individuals and families instead of young professionals and families. As a result, the bank's products are tailored more towards individual financial stability and sustainability through personalised insurance and loan policies. Products lean towards home and business loans, with a focus on sustainable individual and commercial growth of members, as well as offering continual guidance to older customers seeking advice over casual financial management of personal assets.

In a 2018 deal with Macquarie Telecom, Regional Australia Bank established an agreement worth over $1 million to provide NBN fibre to its locations to offer new services such as videoconferencing which were previously unfeasible in small rural branches. The deal comes as rural banks face an ongoing and increasing disparity with larger metropolitan branches with regard to technical accessibility and efficiency.

In 2016, Regional Australia Bank launched a partnership with Frank Digital to relaunch their website to be more mobile and tablet accessible and, according to Matt Barbelli, the company's founder, to “act as an extension to Regional Australia Bank’s branches” (2016).

=== Open banking ===
Regional Australia Bank became Australia's first Accredited Data Recipient in the Australia's economy-wide open data regulation, Consumer Data Right (CDR), on 12 March 2020. When the CDR launched on 1 July 2020, Regional Australia used the Consumer Data Right in its loan processing system. Being the first to achieve this outcome required significant custom software development by the talented in-house development team. The resulting Accredited Data Recipient Gateway package, which handles CDR ecosystem interactions, was released as open-source software through GitHub, available for use by other CDR data recipients.

On 24 November 2020, Regional Australia Bank became the 5th Data Holder within Australia's Consumer Data Right, the first outside of the mandated Big Four Banks, as part of an Australian Open banking initiative. This initiative accelerated the bank's customers' ability to share their data between financial institutions and gain better access to services. Regional Australia Bank partnered with Biza.io to create an information sharing platform for its customers to access and benefit from the open banking initiative. The platform became ACCC and CDR compliant within three months of development.

== Competition ==
The configuration of regional banking in Australia consists of four key stakeholders; AMP, Bank of Queensland, Bendigo & Adelaide Bank and Suncorp. Bendigo Bank's partnership with Rural Bank, providing financial and banking services to regional customers through 798 branches exists in direct competition with Regional Australia Bank's products and service offerings. These banks, alongside the big four banks, represent the main competitive environment for Regional Australia Bank. The rise in uptake of online banking as an alternative for the big four banks to provide financial services has meant the closure of many of their regional and rural branches. However, as many of these areas have poor internet connectivity, with 39% of non-metropolitan households having internet access in 2001 (Australian Bureau of Statistics, Household Use of Information Technology, Catalogue No. 8146.0, Canberra, May 2001). This has meant that the ‘big four’ have lost a proportion of customers in these areas of branch closure who don't have internet access. Although the Big Four reflect 20% of the value of the ASX top 200 companies, regional banks in Australia and their respective rural customers and locations are more closely aligned with the target demographic for Regional Australia Bank and reflect direct channels of competition for the bank.

The COVID-19 pandemic has meant that individuals must rely on internet banking instead of using personal interactions with bank staff members. For rural or regional customers already facing difficulty using online banking due to either lack of internet connection or lack of expertise of how to use internet banking, this has likely proven difficult.
