= Econography =

Concept in economics

Econography is the study of spending profiles of a population of a region and the culture of its people, down to the postcode level, including consumer and business spending by gender, age, income, living situation and location. Econographic trends describe the historical changes in category spending over time, by segment or community.

== History ==
Econography is one of the many children of economics that as of late has begun to spread. Ever since spending has been accurately analyzed, economists have used this data as a tool to understand the habits of people. Econography focuses mostly on the categorical spending of people and how money is spent in different places. Econography allows people from all over the world to be compared on many different levels in different times throughout history.

== Corporate Use ==
Econography is useful to corporate America. They gather their desired data in a variety of ways. Such as through a survey, by signup information for a website, or by buying your information from a different source. Some people are a part of websites that allow them to partake in major company surveys that have a direct effect on them. How they get this information is not as important as what they do with it. The information is used to draw comparisons and frequencies between many different groups of people. These comparisons are then used for advertising purposes like relevance and placement of ads. The information companies gather has become a milestone in how they interact with their customers. This can also be used as a basis for future product innovations that are best suited for the consumer.

== UBank ==
Australian bank UBank introduced the world's first Econography tool, on Tuesday 6 November 2012, at Finovate, where it won the title of 'Best in Show.' PeopleLikeU is powered by about 23 million people that account for over a billion real but de-identified bank transactions generated by Australian consumers. The data is then cleansed and weighted to give an accurate representation of the spending habits of the entire Australian population, giving consumers the ability, for the first time, to benchmark their spending habits against people that share the same profile, both on a local and national scale.

UBank uses different groups to properly categorize people. Things such as postal code, gender, age, relationship status, and level of income form the basis of the system. Then purchases are sorted into groups like food, shopping, rent, travel, and other day-to-day expanses that allow for accurate representation. This allows people to better compare themselves to others in a practical way that requires little effort. Many users have a relatively easy time using this tool for comparison. When signing up for the program, users are informed that the average user on PeopleLikeU is a single woman who owns a home and makes less than 50 thousand dollars a year.

== Government Use ==
Governments around the globe have many ways of showing the familiar faces of the econography of their region. Censuses and other means of representation have been used over the years to get an accurate description of the financial standpoint of the people. In the United States, the Census Bureau reports the levels of income of most people that participate in the Census. Over the years, these reports have been used as a tool in how Americans spend their money. The way in which these reports are evaluated is a useful tool in econography. Evaluating American spending over the years allows a pattern to be established and creates a basis for future projections. These projections may be able to predict future recessions or times of economic success. These patterns can also be compared to other countries during periods of economic recession or periods of war.

The income levels associated with different time periods throughout American history are an important part of how econography works from a historical standpoint. After the obvious adjustment for inflation, a better perspective can be seen on the financial standing of that time period. This allows people of today to accurately measure just how bad the Great Depression would be in the present-day environment. When given these modified figures, people can more easily conclude the depth of despair that the people living in this time had to endure on a daily basis. For example, today, a loaf of bread can be obtained for under a dollar at the right location; however, during the Great Depression, that same loaf of bread may have cost about eight cents. The value of eight cents compared to a dollar today would hold little to no merit as time, as well as prices, has changed. Now apply the inflation. The eight-cent loaf of bread becomes much more than a dollar and a greater burden on your checkbook. The quality of the bread of the Great Depression is also below the margin of today's cheaper and more efficiently made counterpart. This example illustrates how econography can be used to show differences in not only location but also in generations and in times of increased hardship.
