= Dan Saunders ATM glitch =

Man finds glitch with nab ATMs

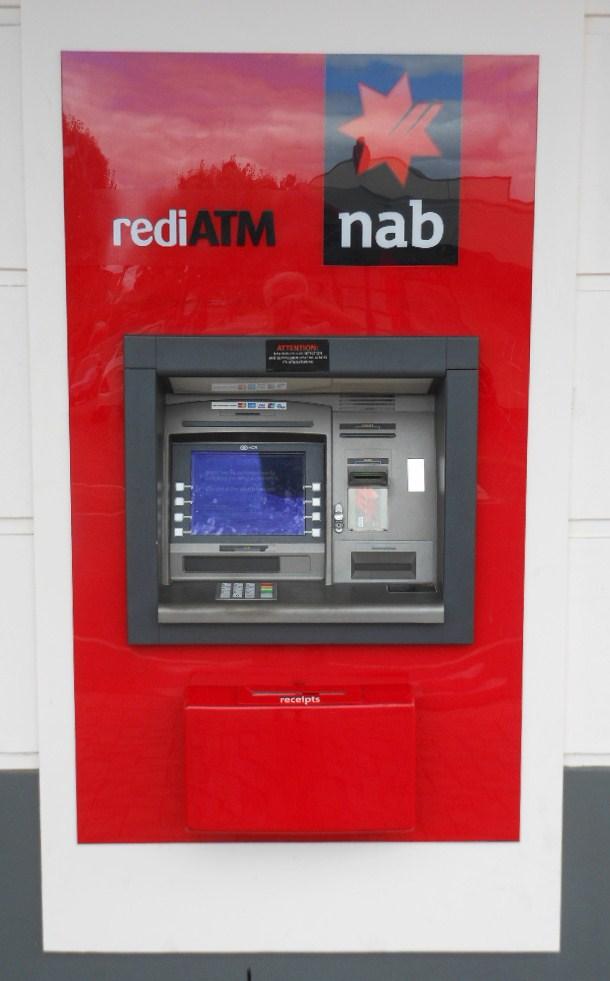
A National Australia Bank ATM from 2011

In 2011, Dan Saunders, an Australian man from Wangaratta, found a glitch in National Australia Bank (NAB) ATMs which allowed him to withdraw an unlimited amount of Australian dollars from the machines. Over the next four and half months Saunders obtained AU$1.6 million, before he outed himself on A Current Affair.

== Background ==
NAB is one of the four largest financial institutions in Australia colloquially referred to as "The Big Four", in terms of market capitalisation, earnings and customers.

In 2011, Saunders, a 29-year-old used to work as a bartender in Wangaratta, in Victoria's north-east. He also had a girlfriend who was a religion teacher, but she later left him because of his gambling addiction.

== Glitch ==
Saunders was at the bar at night before needing to get some cash from the ATM. When he checked his balance, he saw just 3 dollars in his account, but decided to try and withdraw 100 dollars regardless. Despite an error message, the money was withdrawn.

According to Saunders, "I'd been thinking about how odd the whole thing was so I put the card in again and started playing around." He would later figure out that "There was a lag between what the ATM gave me and what my bank balance was, which meant that whatever I spent, I could cover it by doing a simple transfer every night between my credit account and my savings. I could "create" the money by doing a transfer between 1 and 3 in the morning, which is when I realised ATMs go offline."

Within weeks, Dan was fired from his work due to gambling and his girlfriend left him. Saunders would start "living the high life" by spending his money on luxury hotels, private jets, high-end restaurants and clothing, and also give money to friends for college tuition.

== Aftermath ==
Due to guilt and anxiety, Saunders would attempt to get media attention to his story to get arrested, this resulted in a video interview on the TV program A Current Affair. In June 2011, Saunders handed himself in to police after fearing he had become an international criminal. In total, he stole 1.6 million dollars, spent a year in prison for obtaining money, did 18 months for community service and was fined 250,000 dollars. Saunders currently works in the hospitality industry.

== See also ==
- Bill Morgan lottery win
