= Bill Morgan lottery win =

Man wins the lottery for a second time while re-enacting his first win

Bill Morgan 1998 lottery win
- Bill Morgan immediately after winning the lottery for the second time
- Date: 1998
- Location: Melbourne, Australia
- Outcome: Bill Morgan wins A$250,000 while re-enacting his previous scratchcard win

In 1998, Bill Morgan, an Australian man from Melbourne was captured on film winning a A$250,000 scratchcard while re-enacting his previous scratchcard win for a news report. The video of the event has since been widely shared online.

== Background ==
In 1998, Morgan, a 37-year-old truck driver living in a caravan, was almost killed in a car crash which caused him to develop a heart condition. He then suffered an allergic reaction to the drug used to treat this condition, which triggered a fatal heart attack. He was declared clinically dead for 14 minutes and 38 seconds before being revived by paramedics. He subsequently lapsed into a coma for 12 days, during which his family were advised to turn off his life support. After being transferred to a different hospital, he woke up and made a full recovery.

== Lottery win video ==
Within 12 months of his car crash and subsequent heart attack and coma, Morgan won a scratchcard for a A$30,000 Toyota Corolla, secured a new job, and had got engaged. His dramatic change in fortune attracted local media attention, and two weeks after his first scratchcard win in May 1999, Nine News asked him to re-enact it for the B-roll footage of their news report. While being filmed scratching off another card inside the shop, he turned around, held up the ticket and said, "I just won 250,000. I'm not joking. I just won 250,000." before holding his head in his hands and saying to himself, "Please don't film me." He then said, "I don't believe this is happening. I think I will have another heart attack." Celebrating with the shop staff over champagne, he then called his fiancée to inform her of his second win and that they could now afford to buy a new house, and she later commented: "I just hope he hasn't used all his good luck up." The news footage was later uploaded to YouTube, where it went viral.

== Aftermath ==
As of 2020, Morgan still lives in Melbourne with his wife. Although he still suffers from a combination of heart issues and arthritis which forced him to retire early, he stated: "I’ve had a bonus of 22 years and that’s the way you have to live your life. Every day I get up and put on my shoes, and even if I’m not real well I have a shuffle down the road and smell the roses, look at the sun and think about how lucky I am". He continues to buy a scratchcard every week.

== See also ==
- Dan Saunders ATM glitch
