= Ross McEwan =

New Zealand banker

Ross McEwan CBE
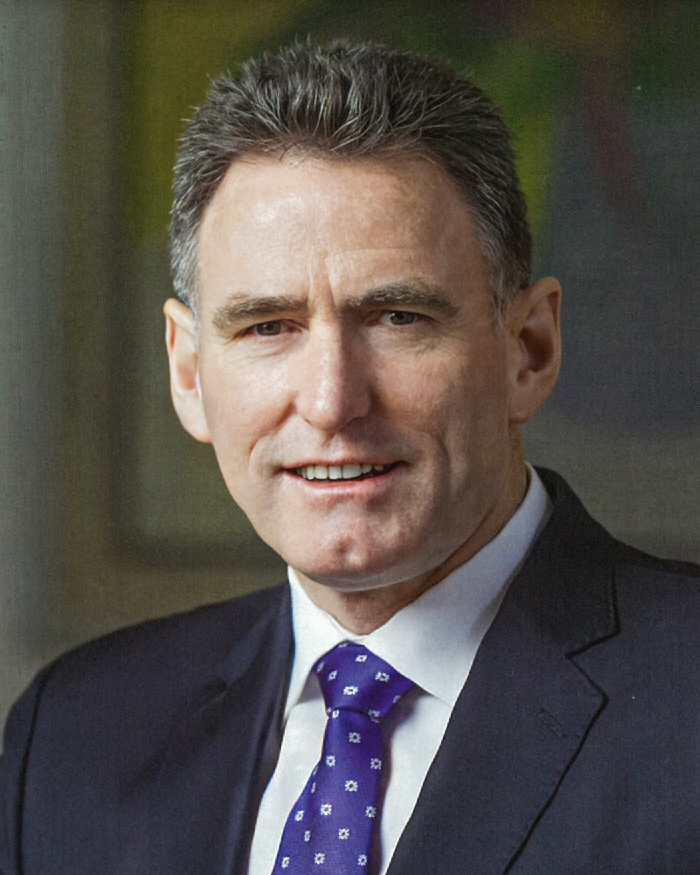
- Born: Ross Maxwell McEwan; 16 July 1957 (age 69); Hastings, New Zealand
- Education: Hastings Boys' High School; Massey University; Harvard Business School
- Occupation: Banker
- Children: 2

Ross Maxwell McEwan CBE (born 16 July 1957) is a New Zealand banker, and former chief executive officer (CEO) and managing director of National Australia Bank.

He was previously the chief executive officer (CEO) of The Royal Bank of Scotland Group (RBS), a FTSE 100 company, from October 2013 to October 2019.

== Early life and education ==
Born in Hastings, McEwan was educated at Hastings Boys' High School, followed by Massey University, where he completed a degree in business studies and human resources, despite having failed an accountancy module twice. He later earned a master in business administration from the Harvard Business School.

== Career ==
McEwan's first top management position was as CEO of Axa New Zealand from 1996 to 2002. He had spent the previous ten years at National Mutual New Zealand, 51% acquired by Axa in 1995. McEwan was then appointed CEO of First NZ Securities, the stockbroking arm of First NZ Capital Securities, the New Zealand affiliate of Credit Suisse Group.

In 2003 McEwan was hired as group executive for retail banking services for the Commonwealth Bank of Australia (CBA). He had been expected to become the next CEO of CBA, but was passed over for the post in 2011.

McEwan joined RBS in August 2012 as head of retail banking.

=== CEO of RBS ===
McEwan was appointed CEO of RBS in October 2013. It was expected that he would move the bank away from investment banking and reduce its international exposure, to focus more on UK retail banking.

In February–March 2014, McEwan attracted press coverage for his view that "free banking" (no current account charges for customers in credit) would have to end sooner or later, and that this would in turn lead to greater transparency from the banks about how they funded their operations.

On 25 February 2015, RBS announced that McEwan would forgo a share award worth £1m saying that he did not want his pay package to "be a distraction from the task of building a great bank". He was still expected to be paid £2.7m despite turning down the award. The announcement came the day before the bank, which was at one point 80% owned by the UK government, was due to release annual results widely expected to be disappointing following a series of fines by banking regulators for failures including for failing to stop manipulation of the foreign exchange market.

In 2018 McEwan was requested by the Treasury Committee in the United Kingdom to explain how RBS's Global Restructuring Group (GRG) had handled its dealings with small businesses from 2008 to 2014. British MP Nicky Morgan, then chair of the committee wrote in reply to McEwan's written submission that it was 'concerned by the pattern of defensiveness, and a failure to acknowledge mistakes, demonstrated by RBS throughout its handling of the GRG affair. Mr McEwan's letter to me is an example of this...'

=== Resignation from RBS ===
In April 2019, McEwan announced his shock resignation on the eve of RBS's AGM and first quarter results. McEwan had a 12 month notice period, and committed himself to remain in situ until a suitable successor was found. Upon his resignation, Chairman Howard Davis commended McEwan on his turn around of the part-nationalised lender, noting "his successful execution of the strategy to refocus the bank back on its core markets here in the UK and Ireland has helped to deliver one of the biggest UK corporate turnarounds in history."

During his tenure as CEO, he focused his work on modernising and simplifying the bank's IT system, and launched many fintech startups to race at the leading-edge of banking innovation.

McEwan was appointed Commander of the Order of the British Empire (CBE) in the 2020 New Year Honours for services to the financial sector.

=== Move to National Australia Bank ===
National Australia Bank announced on 19 July 2019, the appointment of Ross McEwan as Group Chief Executive Officer and Managing Director. NAB chairman-elect Philip Chronican said NAB had secured a senior, global financial services executive with deep experience in international markets and long-standing knowledge of the Australian banking environment.

=== Retirement from National Australia Bank ===
On 7 February 2024, National Australia Bank announced the appointment of Andrew Irvine as Group Chief Executive Officer and Managing Director. It also announced that McEwan would retire from executive roles after a distinguished career in financial and insurance services. Mr Irvine, NAB’s Group Executive Business and Private Banking since 2020, succeeded Ross McEwan on 2 April 2024.

=== Other activities ===
In March 2025, McEwan succeeded Ken MacKenzie as chairman of BHP.

== Personal life ==
McEwan and his wife met through playing basketball, while they were both students at Massey University. She has a degree in food technology and they have two adult daughters. They own a farm in New Zealand.
