= 86 400 =

Australian bank

- Type: Subsidiary
- Industry: Banking
- Founded: 20 Sep 2017
- Founder: Robert Bell; Anthony Thomson
- Defunct: May 2022
- Fate: Acquired by National Australia Bank
- Successor: UBank
- Parent: Cuscal (2019-2021); National Australia Bank (2021-2022)
- Website: www.86400.com.au

:86 400 was an Australian neobank. It was founded in 2017 by Robert Bell and Anthony Thomson.

It was majority owned by payments company Cuscal. It gained a licence to operate as an authorised deposit-taking institution in 2019.

In early 2021, after operating for less than two years, it was taken over by National Australia Bank (NAB), and merged into its UBank subsidiary. This was approved by the Australian Competition & Consumer Commission, despite concerns about reducing competition. In October 2021, after the take-over by NAB, Robert Bell stepped down as CEO, to be replaced by Philippa Watson, CEO of UBank, who combined the roles of CEO of both NAB subsidiaries. The brand was retired in May 2022, becoming part of the newly rebranded "ubank."

According to NAB, the "visual identity, technology, and innovation capability of 86 400" was adopted by ubank.

The name "86 400" represents the number of seconds in a single day.
