= Royal Commission into Misconduct in the Banking, Superannuation and Financial Services Industry =

Australian royal commission into banking

Misconduct in the banking, superannuation, and financial services industry
- Inquiries: Royal Commission into Misconduct in the Banking, Superannuation and Financial Services Industry
- Commissioner: The Honourable Kenneth Madison Hayne AC KC
- Inquiry period: 14 December 2017 – 4 February 2019
- Constituting instrument: Royal Commissions Act 1902 (Cth)
- Website: www.royalcommission.gov.au/banking
- The official website was decommissioned in January 2022. Website archive.

The Royal Commission into Misconduct in the Banking, Superannuation and Financial Services Industry, also known as the Banking Royal Commission and the Hayne Royal Commission, was a royal commission established on 14 December 2017 by the Australian government pursuant to the Royal Commissions Act 1902 to inquire into and report on misconduct in the banking, superannuation, and financial services industry. The establishment of the commission followed revelations in the media of a culture of greed within several Australian financial institutions. A subsequent parliamentary inquiry recommended a royal commission, noting the lack of regulatory intervention by the relevant government authorities, and later revelations that financial institutions were involved in money laundering for drug syndicates, turned a blind eye to terrorism financing, and ignored statutory reporting responsibilities and impropriety in foreign exchange trading.

The Honourable Kenneth Madison Hayne AC KC, the former Justice of the High Court of Australia, served as the sole commissioner and submitted an interim report to the Governor-General of Australia on 28 September 2018, which was tabled in parliament by the Government on the same day. The Royal Commission conducted seven rounds of public hearings over 68 days, called more than 130 witnesses and reviewed over 10,000 public submissions. Commissioner Hayne submitted a final report to the Governor-General on 1 February 2019 with 76 separate recommendations. The final report and the government's response to the report were made public on 4 February 2019.

== Background ==
In 2008, a whistleblower went to ASIC to report a coverup in the Commonwealth Bank of Australia for a former financial planner.

Michelle Grattan characterised the then-incoming Abbott Liberal-National government as being "determined to weaken protections" that Labor had introduced, although she noted these attempts were defeated by the Senate crossbench.

In light of an account fraud scandal at US-bank Wells Fargo, on 5 May 2014 ABC TV Four Corners, in conjunction with Fairfax journalists, broadcast an exposé of a sales-driven culture within the Commonwealth Bank's (CBA) financial planning division, that was described as profit at all cost. Chaired by Labor Senator Mark Bishop, a subsequent Senate committee inquiry recommended a royal commission into the fraud scandal that left thousands of CBA customers millions of dollars out of pocket. The committee reported on the performance of the Australian Securities and Investments Commission (ASIC). Several days later, CBA chief executive Ian Narev apologised unreservedly to customers who lost money in the bank's financial planning scandal. Treasurer at the time, Joe Hockey, whose mother was impacted by the scandal, stated that the bank did not act quickly enough to address the problem. The CBA was subsequently embroiled in other matters including money laundering for drug syndicates, turning a blind eye to terrorism financing, ignoring statutory reporting responsibilities for more than three years on more than 750,000 accounts, and impropriety in foreign exchange trading.

The National Australia Bank (NAB) was implicated during 2015 in a series of scandals concerning financial planners where it was revealed that the NAB quietly paid millions of dollars in compensation to hundreds of clients for what it considered was inappropriate financial planning advice by its staff between 2009 and 2015. A whistleblower claimed that there was a volatile, toxic and Machiavellian culture within NAB. ASIC banned NAB staff who were previously licensed to provide financial advice. Subsequently, it was revealed that NAB were also implicated in impropriety in foreign exchange trading.

In 2017, Westpac was implicated in allegations that it rigged one of Australia's key interest rates, the bank bill swap rate and was sued under responsible lending laws for using an automated process to decide whether peoples' home loan applications met lending criteria. Further, a Westpac banker was imprisoned for fraudulently lending millions of dollars to elderly pensioners. Following ASIC investigations, Westpac was instructed to make a donation of $3 million to Financial Literacy Australia after ASIC found that the bank's employees disclosed confidential details of their clients' orders to other foreign exchange traders. Westpac refunded $65 million to 220,000 customers after it failed to pass on benefits they should have received under package deals, including home loans, credit cards and transaction accounts, offered by the bank.

The ANZ Bank (ANZ) was also implicated in the bank bill swap rate scandal and settled with ASIC prior to the commencement of legal proceedings.

Macquarie Bank was implicated in the foreign exchange trading scandal and was instructed to donate $2 million to charity and to open up its foreign exchange arm to scrutiny after ASIC uncovered a series of breaches by its traders.

Appearing before the House of Representatives Standing Committee on Economics, chief executives of the ANZ, CBA, NAB, and Westpac advised that, despite consumer complaints, very few senior bank staff were dismissed due to misconduct; despite supervising more junior staff who had been dismissed.

In June 2015, Greens senator Peter Whish-Wilson put forward a motion for the Abbott government to hold a royal commission into misconduct in the financial services industry. The motion was voted down in the Senate 39–14, with Labor and the government opposing it.

In a 2016 speech before the National Press Club, opposition leader Bill Shorten outlined his plans for a royal commission into the banking sector, should Labor win government at the 2016 federal election. Meanwhile, Liberals Warren Entsch MP also supported calls for a royal commission; as well as CBA whistleblower, Jeff Morris, who, for eight years, since 2008, documented the industry's "systemic bad behaviour".

Despite an attempt launched in April 2016 to protect consumer interests, increase transparency and accountability, and build trust and confidence in banks, amidst growing community concerns, in January 2017 twenty-five members of the Australian Banking Association launched Better Banking, an initiative intended to provide improved products, services and culture, and to provide consumers with helpful information and resources. In April 2016 Steve Sedgwick AO, a former senior Australian public servant, was commissioned to conduct a review into bankers' pay and commissions; and recommended the termination of bonus payments to retail bank employees that are linked to sales performance. In March 2017 ASIC handed down a report on financial advice compliance in the sector; and in September 2017 the Turnbull government introduced legislation to establish the Australian Financial Complaints Authority, an external dispute resolution body aimed to simplify how customers resolve complaints with bank and other financial services organisations.

Over the preceding years, there had been widespread criticism of ASIC's activities as a regulatory body, including its supervision of banks.

In late 2017, as a backlash against the legalisation of same sex marriage, the Nationals threatened to introduce a private member's bill calling for a commission of inquiry into the banking system. It was reported that the bill would be co-sponsored by the Nationals, Labor, the Greens and Senate crossbench parties. Nationals Senator Barry O'Sullivan, and LNP MPs George Christensen and Llew O'Brien, together with the Greens, Labor, and Senate crossbench parties, had enough numbers to force the Turnbull government's opposition to a royal commission.

In the 2017 federal budget, the Turnbull government proposed the introduction of a bank tax (or levy) that applied to banks with liabilities of at least $100 billion. The levy came into effect on 1 July 2017.

With political pressure mounting, on 30 November 2017 Turnbull and his Treasurer, Scott Morrison, announced plans for a royal commission. The royal commission was established on 14 December 2017.

== Terms of reference ==
On 14 December 2017, the Governor-General Sir Peter Cosgrove issued Commonwealth letters patent appointing the commissioner and the commission's terms of reference. The commissioner was directed "to inquire into and report on misconduct in the banking, superannuation and financial services industry." It was due to table its final report on 1 February 2019, which had been noted to be not long before the 2019 Australian federal election.

=== Response ===
The creation of the Royal Commission was supported by the Opposition leader, Bill Shorten; however, opposition treasury spokesperson, Chris Bowen, stated that Labor disagreed with the terms of reference and wanted the Government to consult with consumer groups and those impacted by financial scandals. Meanwhile, the Greens sought to widen the commission's terms of reference. The Australian Banking Association, and some of its members, who initially opposed calls for a royal commission, supported the terms of reference; however the Association's CEO, Anna Bligh warned that the commission could push up interest rates.

As revelations of misconduct came to light during the hearings, political pressure was exerted on the Turnbull government, due to beliefs that it had delayed the establishment of the Royal Commission; and Mathias Cormann, the Finance Minister, indicated that if Commissioner Hayne sought more time to extend the life of the Royal Commission, the government would respond positively.

== Commissioner and executive ==
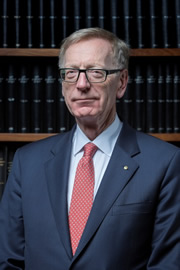
Kenneth Hayne, Royal Commissioner

On 1 December 2017 Turnbull announced the appointment of Kenneth Hayne as the sole commissioner for the royal commission.

Commissioner Hayne subsequently announced that he would be assisted by legal counsel including Rowena Orr KC, Michael Hodge, Albert Dinelli, Eloise Dias, and Mark Costello.

== Powers ==
The powers of Royal Commissions in Australia are set out in the enabling legislation, the Royal Commissions Act 1902.

Royal Commissions, appointed pursuant to the Royal Commissions Act or otherwise, have powers to issue a summons to a person to appear before the Commission at a hearing to give evidence or to produce documents specified in the summons; require witnesses to take an oath or give an affirmation; and require a person to deliver documents to the Commission at a specified place and time. A person served with a summons or a notice to produce documents must comply with that requirement, or face prosecution for an offence. The penalty for conviction upon such an offence is two years imprisonment. A Royal Commission may authorise the Australian Federal Police to execute search warrants.

== Submissions ==
The Commission invited individuals or entities to make public submissions using an online form, with provision for those who require further assistance via email or telephone. The purpose of the submissions was to identify the nature of alleged misconduct, the factors that led to the misconduct occurring, and the steps taken to resolve the complaint and the outcomes of the complaint. The role of the commission was not to resolve individual complaints, yet to come to an understanding of the systematic failures that may have led to the complaint occurring.

The Royal Commission conducted seven rounds of public hearings over 68 days, called more than 130 witnesses and reviewed over 10,000 public submissions of which the leading matters related to personal finance, superannuation, and small business finance.

The commissioner identified a number of themes, as follows:

1. Some Features of the Australian Banking Industry: Background Paper
2. Some Features of the Australian Mortgage Broking Industry: Background Paper
3. Some Features of Car Financing in Australia: Background Paper
4. Everyday Consumer Credit – Overview of Australian Law Regulating Consumer Home Loans, Credit Cards and Car Loans: Background Paper

== Public hearings ==
Initial proceedings commenced on 12 February 2018. Key comments made by the Commissioner during this hearing and elsewhere include:

A part of what I've got to do eventually, I think, may be to assess what ADIs and other financial service entities have made of complaints and revelations. The industry is a large industry, large participants, lots of people. Things go wrong. It's a human system, therefore things go wrong. Sometimes things go wrong through dishonesty. Sometimes things go wrong because of neglect, carelessness, or just sheer coincidence. I understand all of that. There is a whole raft of law up there governing this industry. One thing that I may have to look at, I think, is what the attitude, either of the industry generally, if there were such a thing, participants in the industry, is to the notion of obedience to the law. Obedience to the law that governs the way they conduct their affairs. There may be a difference – I don't say there is – there may be a difference between a breakdown in controls and an acknowledgment of breach of law. Treat that as the soliloquy it undoubtedly is, Mr Waldron, or deal with it as you wish. But I don't want people ignoring the fact these are ideas that are at least on the table.

— Hayne, K.

=== Consumer lending practices ===
The first round of public hearings commenced on 13 March, and these were focused on consumer lending practices within the context of credit products such as home loans, car loans and credit cards. Over fourteen days, the Royal Commission heard from executives from ANZ Bank, APRA, ASIC, Aussie Home Loans, Citigroup, Commonwealth Bank, the Finance Sector Union, ING Bank, NAB, Smartline HomeLoans and Westpac. Before the Royal Commission:

ANZ ... acknowledged that it had engaged in misconduct and conduct falling short of community standards expectations relating to home loans, credit cards, processing errors and car finance.

The Royal Commission heard that ANZ had failed to accurately verify the living expenses of home loan customers referred to the bank by mortgage brokers, believing that this was the responsibility of the brokers, in spite of a conflict of interest in doing so; and that, due to processing issues, it had charged nearly 500,000 home loan customers the incorrect interest rate for more than ten years, leading the bank to overcharge customers by approximately $90 million.

CBA acknowledged that it had engaged in misconduct in limited respects.... in conduct falling below community standards and expectations in relation to add-on insurance, responsible lending and offers of credit.

Commissioner Hayne questioned whether the CBA was "economical with the truth" in failing to tell customers the value of commissions it pays to mortgage brokers in return for selling its products. The Royal Commission also heard that due to a system of trailing commissions paid to mortgage brokers, the CBA rewarded brokers for encouraging customers to enter into larger home loans and for longer terms than needed. The Royal Commission heard that the CBA-owned Aussie Home Loans retained commissions where broker agreements were terminated following detection of alleged fraudulent activity; and that it failed to refer such brokers to the industry association for disciplinary action.

[NAB]...acknowledged it had engaged in misconduct and conduct falling below community standards and expectations in relation to home lending, credit cards, personal loans and processing or administration errors.

However, when queried on the matter by Counsel Assisting that "...there was fraudulent conduct engaged in by NAB bankers and by introducers... We see no reference here to any fraudulent conduct. In fact the language is very qualified in the description of the conduct here... the conduct was in breach of the group's policies and processes including provision of potentially unsuitable loans, reliance on potentially false documentation, use of correct income figures, potentially dishonest application of customers' signatures, and a potential misstatement of some loans in loan documentation. Now, what I want to put to you is that NAB knows and you know that there were unsuitable loans, there was false documentation, there was dishonest application of customers' signatures on consent forms and there was the misstatement of some loans in loan documentation. All of those things occurred, did they not?" NAB's Mark Waldron agreed that conduct was fraudulent and beyond misconduct; "Yes, we can now say that they have occurred." It was reported that NAB employees in greater western Sydney were accepting bribes in order to facilitate loans they knew were based on false documentation in order to reach lending targets and to collect personal bonuses; and up to 15 per cent of all home loans approved did not meet NAB's standard criteria for valuation, serviceability and document verification.

Westpac ... acknowledged that across the brands [of Westpac, St George Bank, Bank of Melbourne and RAMS] it ... engaged in actual or potential misconduct and conduct falling below community standards and expectations relating to home lending, credit cards, car loans, add-on insurance, processing or administration errors and unsolicited offers of credit.

The Commission heard that, similar to ANZ, Westpac believed that it was not its responsibility to verify loan applicants' personal expenses, with this responsibility resting with brokers, especially for car loans originated by motor vehicle dealers acting as brokers; and that financial kickbacks to car dealers reflected a conflict of interest.

=== Financial planning and wealth management ===
In mid-April 2018, the second round of hearings, focused on the financial planning and wealth management industry commenced. During this round, on 20 April 2018 Craig Meller resigned as CEO of AMP Limited after it was revealed in a public hearing before the Royal Commission that AMP charged clients for financial advice which was not provided, and misled ASIC on numerous occasions.

In August 2018 it was revealed that NAB subsidiary, MLC Limited, had charged some of its customers "adviser contribution fees" and "employer service fees" on its superannuation products. By its own admission, NAB executives told the Royal Commission that the customers may have not received any service, in spite of being charged a fee. NAB tried to disguise these fees as commissions. The following month ASIC commenced civil proceedings in the Federal Court alleging that NAB-owned superannuation entities had deducted $100 million in fees from more than 300,000 customers where services were not provided. Appearing before the Royal Commission in November 2018, NAB Chief Executive Officer Andrew Thorburn defended the fees-for-no-service issue as a "process issue" rather than dishonesty. Days earlier, NAB Chairman and former Secretary of The Treasury Ken Henry defensively appeared before the Royal Commission, with some tense exchanges between Henry and Orr.

=== Small and medium enterprises ===
The third round of hearings commenced in mid-May 2018 and was focused on small and medium enterprises.

Implications: SMEs are now looking towards other sources of finance; shadow lenders, private loans, bonds etc. The commission has also brought about changes in the provision of lending under the new industry code and granted ASIC new enforceable code of provisions.

=== Financial services and Indigenous communities ===
In July, proceedings moved to Darwin to examine financial services, particularly funeral insurance, and how they impacted on Indigenous communities. The Royal Commission did not consider consumer leases, payday loans or in-store credit arrangements' impacts on Indigenous communities because they are not within the terms of reference.

The discrepancy between average life expectancy of an Indigenous individuals and non-indigenous, highlights a flaw in the superannuation system, where essentially individuals are restricted access to their super until 60 years. For many this is way too late and individuals need access to these funds to support themselves, their family and their community. To put this in perspective, the average life expectancy of an Indigenous male in the NT is 63.6 years.

To address barriers to financial literacy barriers, the Royal Commission recommended training Indigenous financial counsellors.They can spend time in remote communities, educating Aboriginal and Torres Strait Islander people about financial services and advisory. This initiative aims to empower Indigenous communities with the knowledge and skills necessary to navigate the financial system, reducing their vulnerability to financial misconduct and exploitation

== Reports ==
On 28 September 2018 Commissioner Hayne submitted an interim report on progress of the commission to the Governor-General. The interim report, together with a volume each of case studies and appendices was tabled in Parliament on the same day. In its interim report, the Commissioner noted that some (mis)conduct by financial services entities was known to regulators and that the commission had also unearthed other conduct that brought public condemnation. The interim report focused on two key issues; why did it happen, and what can be done to avoid it happening again?

In responding to the issue of 'why', the Commissioner determined that:

.....the answer seem(ed) to be greed – the pursuit of short term profit at the expense of basic standards of honesty..... From the executive suite to the front line, staff were measured and rewarded by reference to profit and sales..... When misconduct was revealed, it either went unpunished or the consequences did not meet the seriousness of what had been done. The conduct regulator, ASIC, rarely went to court to seek public denunciation of and punishment for misconduct. The prudential regulator, APRA, never went to court. Much more often than not, when misconduct was revealed, little happened beyond apology from the entity, a drawn-out remediation program and protracted negotiation with ASIC of a media release, an infringement notice, or an enforceable undertaking that acknowledged no more than that ASIC had reasonable ‘concerns’ about the entity’s conduct. Infringement notices imposed penalties that were immaterial for the large banks. Enforceable undertakings might require a ‘community benefit payment’, but the amount was far less than the penalty that ASIC could properly have asked a court to impose.

In responding to the issue of 'what now', the Commissioner opined that:

.....The law already requires entities to ‘do all things necessary to ensure’ that the services they are licensed to provide are provided ‘efficiently, honestly and fairly’. Much more often than not, the conduct now condemned was contrary to law. Passing some new law to say, again, ‘Do not do that’, would add an extra layer of legal complexity to an already complex regulatory regime..... Should the existing law be administered or enforced differently? Is different enforcement what is needed to have entities apply basic standards of fairness and honesty: by obeying the law; not misleading or deceiving; acting fairly; providing services that are fit for purpose; delivering services with reasonable care and skill; and, when acting for another, acting in the best interests of that other? The basic ideas are very simple. Should the law be simplified to reflect those ideas better?

The Commissioner detailed that there would be a further round of public hearings to consider these and other questions, for consideration in the Commissioner's Final Report. The interim report contained substantial findings against banks, insurance companies, and financial planners.

Commissioner Hayne handed his final report to the Governor-General on 1 February 2019. The final report comprised a 496-page document together with seven themes and 76 separate recommendations, supported by a volume each of cases studies and appendices. On 4 February 2019 the government issued its response to the Commissioner's recommendations.

=== Feedback on the final report ===
Commissioner Hayne did not make or name any specific individual who should face criminal charges. Instead, his report made 24 recommendations relating to institutions and individuals about dishonest misconduct and charged the regulators with the responsibility for taking action. Some media feedback was that this approach was part of the problem, citing that ASIC, in particular, had a long history of not proactively enforcing its powers. Some of Hayne's most scathing comments were reserved for NAB's chair, Ken Henry, and CEO, Andrew Thorburn:

NAB also stands apart from the other three major banks. Having heard from both the CEO, Mr. Thorburn, and the Chair, Dr. Henry, I am not as confident as I would wish to be that the lessons of the past have been learned. More particularly, I was not persuaded that NAB is willing to accept the necessary responsibility for deciding, for itself, what is the right thing to do, and then having its staff act accordingly. I thought it telling that Dr. Henry seemed unwilling to accept any criticism of how the board had dealt with some issues. I thought it telling that Mr. Thorburn treated all issues of fees for no service as nothing more than carelessness combined with system deficiencies when the total amount to be repaid by NAB and NULIS on this account is likely to be more than $100 million. I thought it telling that in the very week that NAB’s CEO and Chair were to give evidence before the Commission, one of its staff should be emailing bankers urging them to sell at least five mortgages each before Christmas. Overall, my fear – that there may be a wide gap between the public face NAB seeks to show and what it does in practice – remains.

— Commissioner Hayne, Final Report: Royal Commission into Misconduct in the Banking, Superannuation and Financial Services Industry. 1 February 2019.

Despite initially defending their positions, by 7 February both Henry and Thorburn had announced their resignations.

Financial markets initially responded positively to the final report, having earlier factored in that banks and other financial institutions would be severely penalised. Markets viewed the response from the government as measured and a view that some recommendations would help the financial services sector.

== See also ==
- Banking in Australia
- Financial regulation in Australia
- Four pillars policy
