= Hunter Mutual =

Australian credit union

- Formerly: Upper Hunter Credit Union; Upper Hunter Local Government Employee's Credit Union
- Type: Credit union
- Industry: Financial services
- Founded: 1968
- Defunct: 31 December 2009
- Fate: Merged with New England Credit Union
- Successor: New England Credit Union
- Headquarters: Muswellbrook, New South Wales, Australia
- Number of locations: Muswellbrook, Scone, Aberdeen, Singleton, Murrurundi, Merriwa
- Area served: Upper Hunter Valley, New South Wales
- Services: Banking; Investment; Insurance; Financial Planning
- Number of employees: 29 (2009)
- Website: www.huntermutual.com.au

Hunter Mutual was a credit union based in and serving the Upper Hunter Valley of New South Wales, Australia. It was established in 1968 as the Upper Hunter Local Government Employee's Credit Union. In 1971, it changed its name to the Upper Hunter Credit Union in 1971, and following a restructure of its operations in 2004, it took on the name Hunter Mutual. During the 1990s, when many major banks closed branches in small country towns, Hunter Mutual set up new branches areas within the Upper Hunter where this occurred.

== Merger ==
In July 2009, a proposed merger between Hunter Mutual and the New England Credit Union was announced.

During December 2009, each credit union held their annual general meeting, with a majority of members (96% of Hunter Mutual members, 93% of NECU members) voting to approve the merger. The merger took effect on 1 January 2010, with Hunter Mutual members becoming members of New England Credit Union, with the two computer systems to be merged in March, followed by the introduction of NECU's product range and fee structure. The merged entity has retained all locations. The combined company is the largest inland credit union in Australia.

The plan was that the New England and Orana Credit Union arms of NECU were to be re-branded as New England Mutual and Orana Mutual, mimicking the Hunter Mutual name. All three also had the common name of the Community Mutual Group which was later rebranded as the Regional Australia Bank.
