= UBank =

Australian bank subsidiary

Ubank
- Type: Division
- Industry: Financial services
- Founded: October 1, 2008; 18 years ago
- Headquarters: Sydney, Australia
- Key people: Kanishka Raja (CEO); Greg Sutherland (Founding Chair); Ahmed Fahour (Founding CEO Sponsor)
- Products: Banking, financial and related services
- Parent: National Australia Bank
- Website: ubank.com.au

Ubank is an Australian direct bank, operating as a division of National Australia Bank (NAB). It was established in 2008, providing savings and home loans online as well as over the phone.

Ubank operates under NAB's banking licence and uses its balance sheet, risk management and technology infrastructure. Ubank also participates in the Australian government's deposit guarantee scheme.

== History and Growth ==
Ubank was launched by Gerd Schenkel and Greg Sutherland for National Australia Bank on 1 October 2008, with the purpose of establishing a presence in the "self-directed" customer segment.

NAB stated it aimed to attract new retail customers while operating independently to its other retail brands, and in its 2009 annual report, NAB claimed that this strategy had been "successful". Ubank operates under NAB's banking licence and participates in the Australian government's deposit guarantee scheme.

Deposits were said to exceed over $500 million in one month. NAB claimed Ubank's "customer advocacy and satisfaction levels" to be "among the highest of any institution in Australia" In its 2009 annual report, NAB claimed "almost 10,000 new customers in a month" for Ubank’s USaver product.

NAB's Ubank has been compared to Qantas' Jetstar in terms of a strategy of internal innovation with the objective of opening new market segments for the parent company.

In October 2012, in a media interview about NAB's results briefing, CEO Cameron Clyne claimed that Ubank had "raised $15–16 billion in deposits".

As of October 2015, Ubank had $15.7 billion of customer deposits and $3.6b of mortgages.

In March 2020, Philippa Watson was appointed CEO of Ubank.

As of July 2023, Ubank reported $17b deposits and 700,000 customers.

=== Acquisition of :86 400 ===
A neobank founded by Anthony Thomson and Robert Bell and majority owned by payments company Cuscal, 86 400 gained a licence to operate as an authorised deposit-taking institution in 2019. In January 2021, NAB announced plans to acquire it for $220 million and merge it with Ubank. This was approved by the regulator despite concerns about reducing competition. The transaction was completed in May 2021, with the 86 400 brand terminated a year later and incorporated into the Ubank branding. By February 2023, however, the acquisition had drawn criticism from some customers who faced issues such as being locked out of their accounts and :86 400 staff, who criticised the company's direction.

== Products ==
Ubank allows applicants to apply online or over the phone for a Term Deposit and deposit their money straight away using BPAY. This was a first for the Australian marketplace at that time.

In August 2009, Ubank launched a new online savings account ("USaver") that was reported to differentiate through its online application process.

In February 2011, Ubank launched its first home loan product (dubbed "UHomeloan").

In August 2013, Ubank launched USaver Ultra transaction account.

In August 2020, Ubank ceased offering new accounts and term deposits to Self Managed Superannuation Fund (SMSF). During July 2022, UBank began terminating existing SMSF accounts, with an offer to transfer funds to existing NAB products.

== Awards ==
- In December 2009, Ubank’s USaver online savings account was awarded Money Magazine's "Best of the Best" award.
- In October 2011, Ubank won the BAI Financial Global Product Innovation Award for its refinance mortgage UHomeloan.
- In the 2012, Australian Lending Awards UBank was named Best Online Operator
- November 2012, Ubank’s people like you app wins best in show at Finovate Asia
- 2013 AFR Smart Investor Blue Ribbon Direct Institution of the Year

== Branding and marketing ==
Logo of UBank at launch in 2008

Ubank was cited as an example of effective use of nontraditional marketing such as social media, but also uses traditional marketing such as print and television.

Ubank’s first TV Commercial was launched in 2009, and positioned its savings account using the tagline "Saving is the new spending", attempting to capture the spirit of the 2008 financial crisis at the time.

Ubank also launched a series of YouTube videos called Ubank Moneybox, meant to educate and entertain. In February 2016 Ubank launched a new visual identity, designed to reposition the bank as a "utility".

In 2019, Ubank introduced a digital assistant named Mia, who aimed at helping home buyers apply for their home loans. According to Ubank, Mia is the "latest tech innovation, designed to answer any burning questions you have about your home loan application. Short for ‘My Interactive Agent’, Mia helps simplify your experience by giving on-the-spot answers to a huge range of the most commonly asked questions during the home loan application."

In May 2022, Ubank rebranded their logo to incorporate the style of the acquired :86 400 branding to reflect the merged entity.

=== Controversies ===
In 2016, Ubank launched a controversial advertising campaign using terminally ill people which garnered many complaints.

The company defended the campaign as being "disruptive".

In 2022, a customer reported the bank to the Australian Financial Complaints Authority that they had not been able to access their account. In response, the bank sent a letter to a customer offering $100 compensation for their issues. However, according to the letter, the compensation was offered on the condition that they ceased taking further action against the bank and kept the agreement confidential. This comes only a few months after multiple customers had money drained from their accounts.

== See also ==
- Banking in Australia
- List of banks
- List of banks in Australia
- List of banks in Oceania
