= Financial regulation in Australia =

Financial regulation in Australia encompasses the laws, institutions, and supervisory practices that govern the country’s banking, securities, insurance, payments, and consumer‑finance sectors. The framework is built around a “twin peaks” model, with the Australian Prudential Regulation Authority overseeing prudential stability and the Australian Securities and Investments Commission responsible for market conduct, corporate regulation, and consumer protection. The Reserve Bank of Australia contributes to the system through its monetary policy role, payments oversight, and financial‑stability analysis, while the Australian Competition and Consumer Commission regulates competition and aspects of consumer law relevant to financial services.

Australia’s regulatory architecture is shaped by legislation such as the Corporations Act 2001, Banking Act 1959, and Insurance Act 1973, along with policy coordination through the Council of Financial Regulators. The system has evolved through major reforms responding to financial crises, technological change, and inquiries including the Financial System Inquiry and the Royal Commission into Misconduct in the Banking, Superannuation and Financial Services Industry. Contemporary regulatory priorities include strengthening consumer protections, addressing systemic risk, and adapting oversight to digital finance and emerging market practices.

== History ==
In 1984 the Government of Australia established the Financial System Inquiry following a period of financial deregulation that started in the early 1970s.

In 1997, Stan Wallis produced a report of his inquiry into Australia's financial system, entitled the Final Report of the Financial System Inquiry and commonly referred to as "the Wallis report." Wallis recommended that the best structure for Australia at that time would involve two regulators: one responsible for prudential regulation of any entity that needed to be prudentially regulated; and one responsible for market and disclosure regulation of any financial products being offered to Australian consumers.

== Regulators ==
Financial regulation in Australia is split mainly between the Australian Securities & Investments Commission (ASIC) and the Australian Prudential Regulatory Authority (APRA). The Australian Securities Exchange has also played a role in regulating market conduct.

ASIC has responsibility for market integrity and consumer protection and the regulation of investment banks and finance companies. However, in practice it manifests this function in the oversight of External Dispute Resolution schemes (EDRs). There is now one ASIC approved EDR scheme operating in Australia, the Australian Financial Complaints Authority (AFCA) was formed to take over from the two previous schemes. Previously there were two ASIC approved EDRs currently operating in Australia. The most prominent is the Financial Ombudsman Service (Australia) (FOS) which receives over 30,000 complaints per year. The second is the Credit and Investment Ombudsman (CIO), which received 4,760 complaints in the 2015/16 financial year. Both the FOS and CIO are not for profit, non governmental organisations funded by members including banks, financial advisers and other financial service providers. Thus, Banking regulators have a significant private and self-regulatory element. The Australian Bankers' Association Inc. is responsible for drafting of the Code of Banking Practice. In 2016 ASIC admitted to the Joint Committee on Financial Services and Corporations that ASIC does not have the power to oversee FOS on a day-to-day basis.

APRA is responsible for the licensing and prudential supervision of Authorised Deposit-taking Institutions (ADIs), life and general insurance companies and superannuation funds. All financial institutions regulated by APRA are required to report on a periodic basis to APRA. APRA has issued capital adequacy guidelines for banks which are consistent with the Basel II guidelines. Investment banks (which do not otherwise operate as ADIs) are neither licensed nor regulated under the Banking Act and are not subject to the prudential supervision of APRA. However, most investment banks are required under the Financial Sector (Collection of Data) Act 2001 to provide statistical information to APRA.

The Reserve Bank of Australia (RBA) retains its central banking functions including responsibility for most payment systems and setting of monetary policy.

The Australian Competition & Consumer Commission (ACCC) regulates anti-competitive behaviour. However, it has an agreement with ASIC that ASIC oversees the majority of bank and financial service product and services providers.

All of these regulators are independent statutory authorities without direct oversight by a government department. Both the RBA and APRA are managed by boards comprising ex officio and independent non-executive directors or governors appointed by the Treasurer, while ASIC and the ACCC are governed by executive commissioners who also have day-to-day responsibility for its operations. The directors and commissioners have security of tenure, and senior personnel face regular scrutiny by parliamentary committees and are bound by statute to act properly. Nonetheless, there is little direct supervision of the regulators' activities.

Senior representatives of the RBA, APRA, ASIC and the Department of the Treasury comprise the Council of Financial Regulators.

== Australian financial services licence ==
The Corporations Act 2001 sets up a uniform approach to the regulation of financial services through a uniform licensing and disclosure regime. The general regulatory position is that a person (whether an individual or corporate entity) carrying on a financial services business in Australia must, unless exempted, hold an Australian financial services licence (AFSL) issued by ASIC.

A financial services business, for which an Australian financial service licence is required, includes:

- dealing in a financial product
- the provision of advice
- making a market for a financial product
- operating a registered managed investment scheme, or
- providing a custodial or depository service in respect of financial products.

Central to the regulation is the concept of a "financial product". Under Australian law, the term is defined very broadly to cover facilities through which a person making a financial investment, manages financial risk or makes non-cash payments. There are also a number of financial products that are currently not regulated as "financial products" such as many credit facilities.

The licensing provisions in the Corporations Act 2001 are expressed to have extraterritorial effect, so as to capture regulated financial services activities conducted outside Australia, which are intended to or likely to have the effect of including persons in Australia to use those services.

The Corporations Act draws a clear distinction between the provision of products and services to retail clients and wholesale clients. There are extensive disclosure requirements when financial services are provided to retail clients.

== Financial markets ==
The operation of financial markets (such as exchanges, liquidity pools, crossing systems and other trading platforms) and clearing and settlement facilities in Australia (including clearing houses and other central clearing counterparties), or targeted at Australian users, is subject to a separate licensing regime through the Australian Securities Exchange (ASX).

== Exchange control ==
Most foreign exchange transactions are free from regulation. The RBA has delegated its control to authorised money market dealers and foreign exchange dealers.

== Foreign investment ==
Foreign investment in the Australian banking sector is subject to review by the Foreign Investment Review Board, and needs to be consistent with the Banking Act, the Financial Sector (Shareholdings) Act 1998 and banking policy, including prudential requirements. Any proposed foreign takeover or acquisition of an Australian bank will be considered by FIRB on a case-by-case basis and judged on its merits.

== Anti-money laundering ==
Financial service providers (and others) are required by the Anti-Money Laundering and Counter-Terrorism Financing Act 2006 to identify and monitor customers using a risk-based approach, develop and maintain a compliance program, report suspicious matters and certain cash transactions and file annual compliance reports.

== See also ==
- Banking in Australia
- Economy of Australia
- Royal Commission into Misconduct in the Banking, Superannuation and Financial Services Industry
