= Andrew Thorburn =

Australian businessman

Andrew Thorburn (born 13 April 1965) is an Australian-based businessman. He is a former CEO of Bank of NZ (BNZ), and also of National Australia Bank (NAB).

== Early life ==
Thorburn was born in Melbourne and is a dual Australian–New Zealand citizen. His mother is a New Zealander.

== Banking career ==
Thorburn joined ASB Bank in Auckland, New Zealand, in 1986. He moved to Sydney to join the Commonwealth Bank of Australia in 1997. He then joined St George Bank in 2002. He moved to NAB in January 2005 as Head of Retail Banking. In 2008, he was appointed to be CEO of BNZ, and in 2014 the CEO of NAB.

At NAB, he moved to divest of non-core assets and focus on Australian and New Zealand interests. He launched a transformation of NAB in 2017 involving greater investment in technology, a reduction in costs, and an investment in business banking.

As a result of the Royal Commission into Misconduct in the Banking and Superannuation industry Thorburn resigned from NAB in February 2019. It was widely reported that Thorburn was pressured by the NAB board.

== Essendon Football Club Controversy ==
In October 2022, the announcement of Thorburn's appointment as CEO of Essendon Football Club was widely criticised by then Victorian Premier Daniel Andrews, the media, and Essendon supporters due to the fact that at that time he also served on the board of City on a Hill, an Anglican church in Melbourne. It came to light that some sermons preached at that church were critical of homosexuality and were comparing abortion to murder and the Holocaust. Thorburn's role at the church led him to resign the day after his appointment announcement was made public, and nearly a month before he was due to begin as Essendon FC CEO in November.

Thorburn published a statement shortly afterwards, stating: "today it became clear to me that my personal Christian faith is not tolerated or permitted in the public square… People should be able to hold different views on complex personal and moral matters, and be able to live and work together, even with those differences, and always with respect."

The reason cited by the club was "a clear conflict of interest with an organisation whose views do not align at all with our values as a safe, inclusive, diverse and welcoming club for our staff, our players, our members, our fans, our partners and the wider community." However, Dr Elenie Poulos argued Thornburns appointment in the first place as a failure of leadership and a conflict of interest, a view shared in the Australian Media at large.

Soon after, Thornburn issued legal action over his abrupt sacking, which was settled in December 2022. He also stated he was resigning from all formal responsibilities in his other roles in February 2023. Former West Coast Eagles CEO Craig Vozzo was announced as his replacement.

== Education ==
Thorburn holds a Bachelor of Commerce (Economics) from the University of Auckland, and an MBA from the University of Durham, UK. He is a Fellow of the Australasian Institute of Banking and Finance.

== Personal ==
Thorburn has been married to his wife Kathryn (also a New Zealander) since 1987, and they have three adult children.
