= National Australia Bank =

Australian multinational bank

National Australia Bank Limited

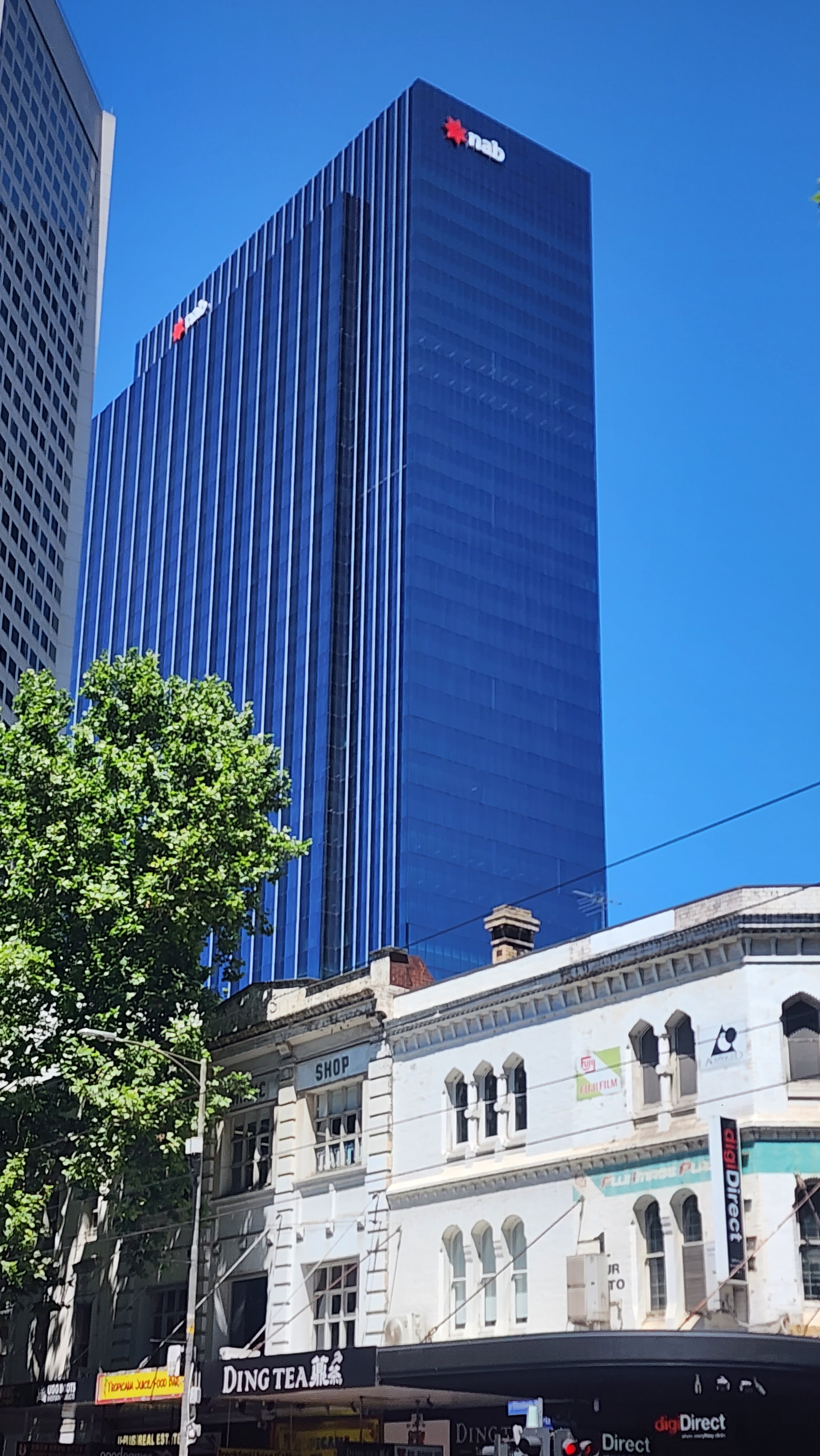
- Headquarters at 395 Bourke Street in Melbourne
- Type: Public
- Traded as: ASX: NAB; S&P/ASX 50 component
- Industry: Banking, financial services
- Founded: October 1, 1981; 45 years ago (as National Commercial Banking Corporation of Australia Limited)
- Headquarters: 395 Bourke Street; Melbourne, Australia
- Area served: Australia
- Key people: Andrew Irvine (CEO); Philip Chronican (chairman)
- Products: Business banking Consumer banking Wholesale banking Wealth management Insurance
- Operating income: ▼ A$20.65 billion (2024)
- Net income: ▼ A$6.98 billion (2024)
- Total assets: ▲ A$1.08 trillion (2024)
- Total equity: ▲ A$62.21 billion (2024)
- Number of employees: 38,996 (2024)
- Divisions: UBank
- Subsidiaries: Bank of New Zealand
- Website: nab.com.au

National Australia Bank Limited (abbreviated NAB, branded and stylised as nab) is one of the four largest financial institutions in Australia (colloquially referred to as "The Big Four") in terms of market capitalisation, earnings and customers. NAB was ranked the world's 21st-largest bank measured by market capitalisation and 52nd-largest bank in the world as measured by total assets in 2019.

As of January 2019, NAB operated 3,500 Bank@Post locations—including 7,000+ ATMs across Australia, New Zealand, and Asia—and served 9 million customers. NAB has an "AA−" long-term issuer rating by Standard & Poor's.

== History ==
=== 1982–1999 ===
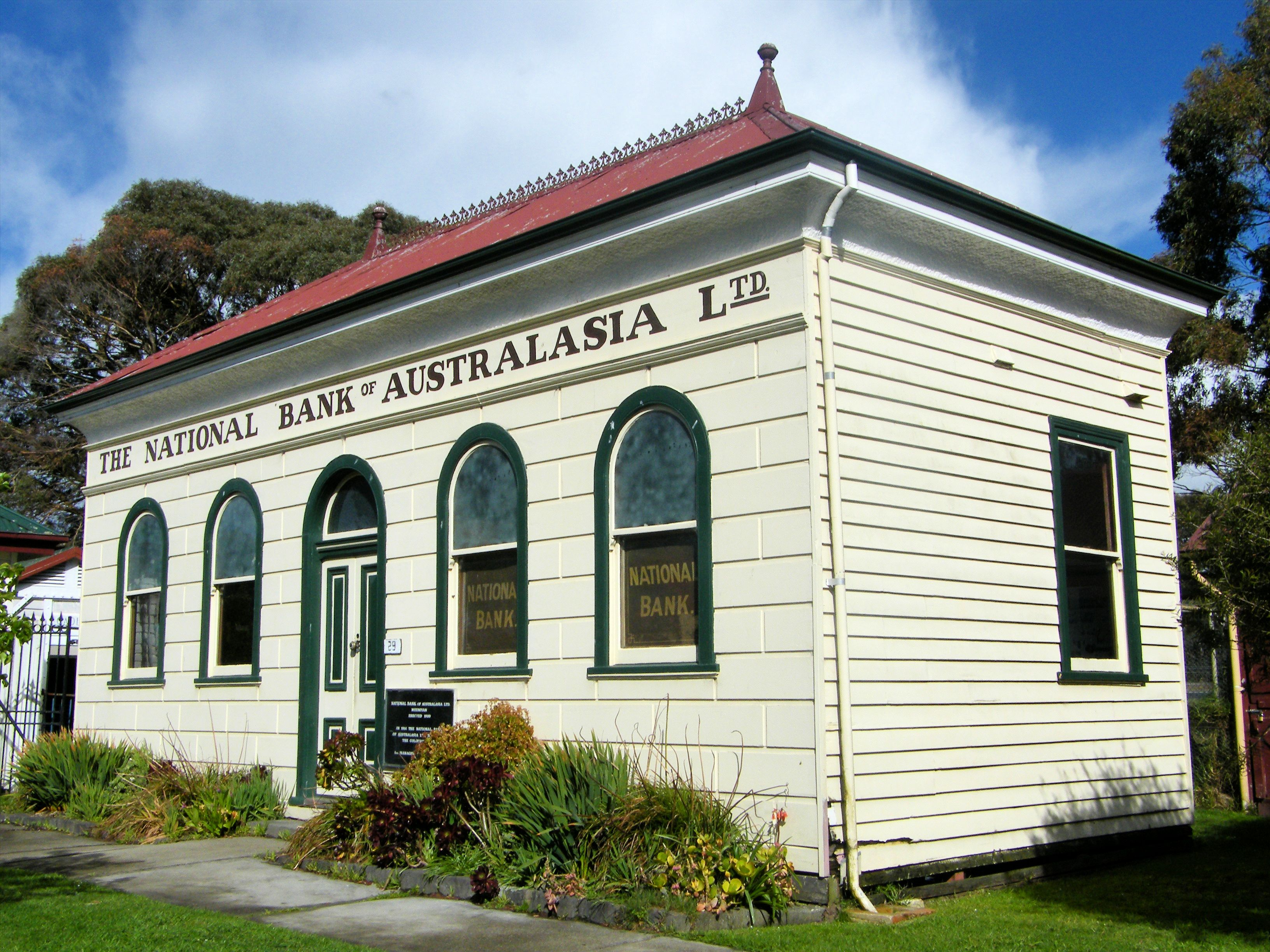
The Meeniyan National Bank of Australasia, now located at Old Gippstown in Moe

National Australia Bank was formed as National Commercial Banking Corporation of Australia Limited in 1982 by the merger of National Bank of Australasia and the Commercial Banking Company of Sydney. The resulting company was subsequently renamed National Australia Bank Limited.

The expanded financial base of the merged entity triggered significant offshore expansion over ensuing years. Representative offices were established in Beijing (1982), Chicago (1982), Dallas (1983), Seoul (1983, upgraded to a branch in 1990), San Francisco (1984), Kuala Lumpur (1984), Athens (1984, closed 1989), Frankfurt (1985, closed 1992), Atlanta (1986), Bangkok (1986), Taipei (1986 upgraded to branch 1990), Shanghai (1988, closed 1990), Houston (1989) and New Delhi (1989).

In 1987, NAB bought Clydesdale Bank (Scotland) and Northern Bank (Northern Ireland and Republic of Ireland) from Midland Bank. It rebranded Northern Bank branches in the Republic of Ireland to National Irish Bank and changed both banks' logos from that of the Midland Bank. In 1990, NAB bought Yorkshire Bank (England and Wales).

In 1992, NAB purchased the Bank of New Zealand, which became a subsidiary of the Australian bank, but retained local governance, with a New Zealand board of directors. At some point, a business entity known as Bank of New Zealand in Australia (BNZA) was absorbed by NAB.

Further acquisitions followed – which at the time had about a 26% market share in the market, and Michigan National Bank (MNB) in 1995. NAB had earlier rationalised its operations in the US and closed its offices in Atlanta, Chicago, Dallas, Houston and San Francisco in 1991.

This period of rapid expansion through acquisition concluded with the purchases in 1997 of HomeSide Lending, a leading US mortgage originator and servicer based in Florida, and most significantly, the acquisition in 2000 of MLC Limited (and related entities) for $4.56bn, one of the biggest mergers in Australian corporate history.

=== 2000s ===
NAB encountered a difficult period in the period 2000–2005. In 2000, NAB sold Michigan National Bank to ABN AMRO, then in 2001 sold HomeSide's operating assets for US$1.9b to Washington Mutual, the largest US savings and loan company, as well as the mortgage unit's loan-servicing technology and operating platform.

The foreign currency trader fraud was the catalyst for the resignations of CEO Frank Cicutto and Chairman Charles Allen. The resignations were preceded by a Board revolt where Catherine Walters emerged as a whistle blower citing serious culture issues at the company having led to the string of failures.

Frank Cicutto was CEO of NAB from 1999 to 2004. The Australian economic environment during his leadership was stable and productive after 17 consecutive years of economic growth since 1992, averaging 3.3 per cent per annum.

In February 2004, John Stewart was appointed CEO of NAB following the resignation of Cicutto. Stewart proceeded with a far reaching re-organisation of the company along regional lines leading to the appointment of Ahmed Fahour as the CEO of Australia in September 2004. On 20 February 2009 Fahour stepped down from the principal board and group executive committee.

In 2005, NAB announced a cut of 2,000 Australian jobs as part of a global cost-cutting program with the intention of cutting around 4,200 positions – about 10.5% of its total workforce globally. It began to outsource back office positions offshore, beginning with a pilot with 23 jobs from the accounts payable department in Melbourne going to Bangalore, India in an agreement with Accenture. Later that year, it sold Northern Bank and National Irish Bank to the Danish Danske Bank. Over 200 additional jobs had been sent offshore by 2006.

As part of the culture change program, a new Australian head office was purpose built at Docklands in Melbourne. This building is characterised by its open plan layout and was officially opened in October 2004. After Cameron Clyne became CEO in 2009, the Docklands building became the global headquarters replacing 500 Bourke Street.

By 2006, NAB had turned its fortunes around, reporting an industry record $4.3 billion profit and winning two local Bank of the Year awards. It also had a major reform which included the refurbishment of all of its branches, and the replacement of signage in and around National branches and buildings, being changed from 'National' to 'nab'.

In May 2007, NAB announced that it would delist from the New York Stock Exchange, and this took place in August 2007. NAB delisted from the London and Tokyo exchanges in 2006. In March 2008, NAB announced that it would send maintenance and support for some core banking applications to India through an offshoring arrangement with Infosys and Satyam, affecting another 260 employees. On 25 July 2008, NAB's announcement of an additional A$830 million provision associated with deterioration in US real estate markets triggered the biggest single-day fall in its share price in 21 years, wiping over A$7 billion from the stock's value. In October 2008, NAB launched a branchless direct bank trading separately as UBank under the leadership of Greg Sutherland and Gerd Schenkel. In January 2009, Cameron Clyne became CEO, and began a strategy of reputation change, wealth management and a focus on domestic markets.

As part of this strategy, NAB's underweight retail bank – under the leadership of Lisa Gray – attempted to increase market share by competing on price and cutting fees. Initially denting earnings in the division, the strategy produced mixed results over the medium term, with cash earnings, market share and customer satisfaction rising, but operating margin and cost to income ratio worsening since it began in 2009. In line with the strategy, NAB attempted to differentiate itself from the other "Big 4" Australian banks in a large, national public relations campaign centred around a theme of "breaking up" with the other banks on Valentine's Day 2011. The campaign received both a positive and negative reception. It also attracted swift competitive responses from other major banks. The campaign won an advertising award at Cannes.

In 2009, NAB acquired the mortgage business of Challenger Financial Services for $385 million, in order to boost its market share in the broker channel. The purchase also included the PLAN, Choice, and FAST mortgage aggregation businesses and approximately 17.5% in Homeloans Ltd. In June that year it paid A$825m ($660m:£401m) for UK insurer Aviva's Australian wealth management businesses, including their Navigator platform. NAB beat off competition from AMP for Navigator. news In July 2009 NAB acquired an 80% stake in the private wealth management division of Goldman Sachs JBWere, for A$99m.

In December 2009 NAB began a nine month attempt to purchase Axa Asia Pacific. This attempt was blocked twice by the Australian Competition & Consumer Commission. The first time, in April 2010, was because the regulator believed that the merger would cause a substantial lessening of competition in the retail investment platform market. NAB subsequently lodged a revised bid which aimed to address these concerns but was rejected a second time in September of that year. The Axa deal's drawn out process drew criticism for the bank's underperformance.

=== 2010s ===
NAB's poor 2012 financial results called its strategy into question: net profit dropped by 22% compared to the previous year. In 2014, the NAB Melbourne Government announced that Cameron Clyne would be succeeded as CEO by Andrew Thorburn, NAB's New Zealand head. In August 2014, Lisa Gray left NAB as part of a broader set of executive changes.

As part of a strategy to focus NAB on its domestic markets, the bank listed its US subsidiary, Great Western Bank, on the New York Stock Exchange in October 2014 as part of an initial public offering. NAB sold its final 28.5% holding in Great Western in July 2015.

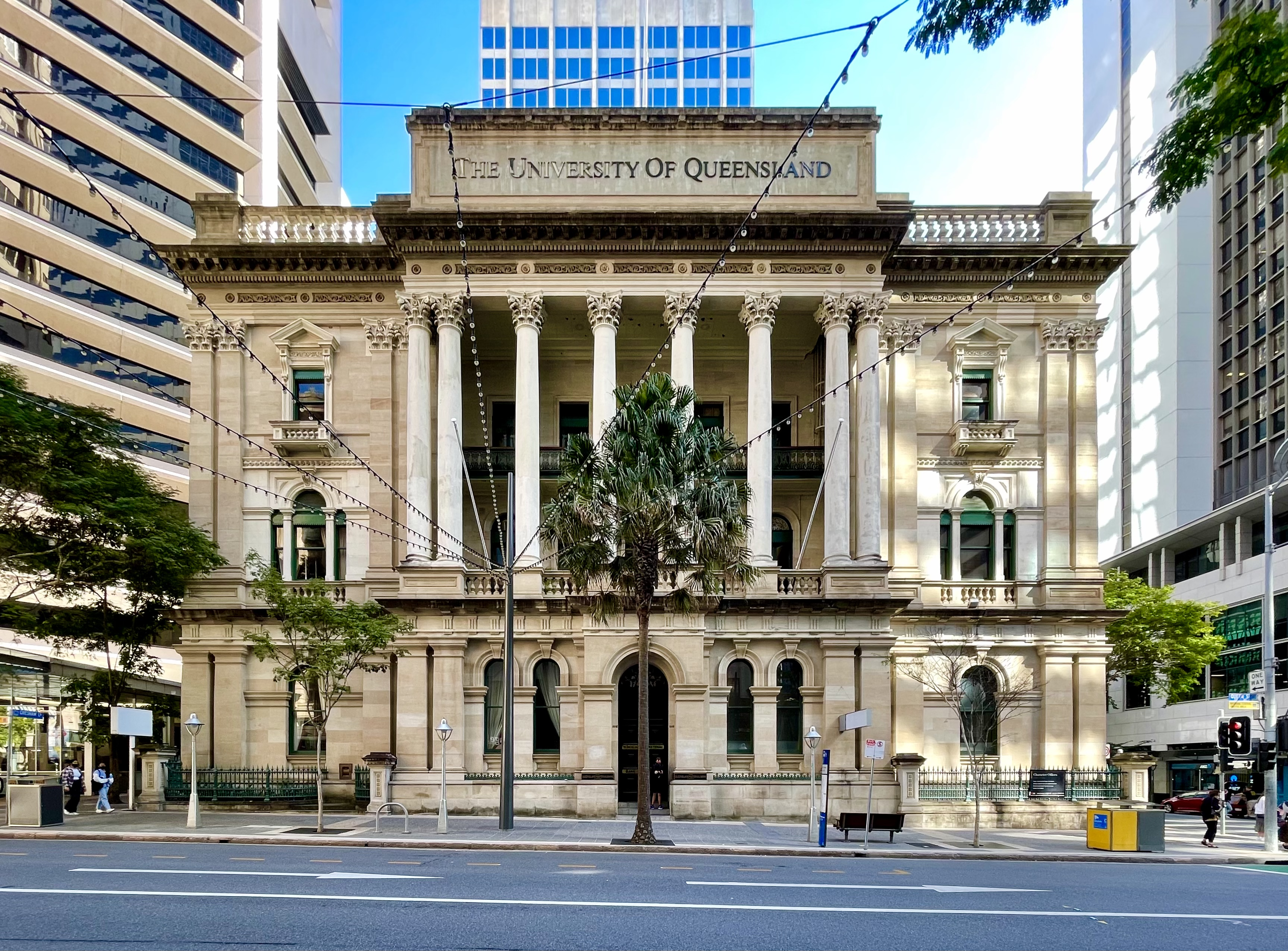
National Australia Bank Building in Brisbane

In May 2015, NAB also confirmed it would demerge its Clydesdale and Yorkshire Bank business in the UK, through an initial public offering. The business was partially floated on the London Stock Exchange and Australian Securities Exchange under a new holding company, The CYBG plc, in February 2016, with the remaining shares distributed to NAB's shareholders.

In July 2019, Ross McEwan was appointed group chief executive officer and managing director, after resigning from the Royal Bank of Scotland in April of that year.

=== 2020s ===
In January 2021, NAB announced plans to acquire the neobank 86 400 for $220 million and subsequently merge it with UBank. In May 2021, NAB completed its sale of its advice, platforms, superannuation and investments and asset management businesses to IOOF Holdings. As part of the MLC Wealth Transaction, NAB retained the companies that operated the advice businesses. In September 2021, NAB temporarily rebranded their logo to JAB to promote vaccines for COVID-19.

In the first half of 2022, NAB relocated its global headquarters from 800 Bourke Street Docklands to a new natural light and greenery purpose built 39 storey building at 395 Bourke Street. The move also replaced National Bank House at 500 Bourke Street. The bank currently has 2 main buildings for employees at 700 Bourke Street Docklands and at 395 Bourke Street (NAB Place). On 1 June 2022, National Australia Bank Limited (NAB) acquired the consumer banking business from Citigroup Pty Ltd (Citi), an Australian branch of Citibank.

On 19 January 2023, NAB announced that it would create a stablecoin called the AUDN that would be pegged to the Australian Dollar, and that the digital asset would be on the Ethereum network. The objective is to streamline cross-border banking transactions, and will also be used for trading carbon credits. AUDN is expected to be live in mid-2023.

On 23 September 2026, NAB experienced a major network outage, lead to an unavailability involving NAB Internet Banking, the NAB Mobile App, NAB Connect, NAB Trade, NAB Broker, and the JBWere wealth management firm. The outage starts before about 13:30 AEST and largely restored at about 16:10 AEST. At 17:00 AEST, the outage is "largely resolved".

== Corporate affairs ==
=== Chief Executives ===
The following individuals have been appointed to serve as chief executive:

| # | Name | Term start | Term end | Ref |
|---|---|---|---|---|
| 1 | Jack Booth | 1 January 1983 | 1985 | |
| 1 | Vic Martin | 1 January 1983 | 1983 | |
| 2 | Nobby Clark | 1985 | 1990 | |
| 3 | Don Argus AO | 1991 | 1999 | |
| 4 | Frank Cicutto | 1999 | September 2004 | |
| 5 | John Stewart | September 2004 | 31 December 2008 | |
| 6 | Cameron Clyne | 1 January 2009 | August 2014 | |
| 7 | Andrew Thorburn | August 2014 | February 2019 | |
| 8 | Ross McEwan | December 2019 | April 2024 | |
| 9 | Andrew Irvine | April 2024 | incumbent | |

=== Chairs ===
The following individuals have been appointed to serve as chairman of the board:

| # | Name | Term start | Term end | Ref |
|---|---|---|---|---|
| 1 | Sir Robert Law-Smith CBE AFC | 1 January 1983 | 1986 | |
| 2 | Sir Rupert Clarke | 1986 | January 1992 | |
| 3 | Bill Irvine OAM | January 1992 | September 1997 | |
| 4 | Mark Rayner | September 1997 | 2001 | |
| 5 | Charles Allen AO | 2001 | February 2004 | |
| 6 | Graham Kraehe AO | February 2004 | September 2005 | |
| 7 | Michael Chaney AO | September 2005 | December 2015 | |
| 8 | Ken Henry AC | December 2015 | July 2019 | |
| 9 | Phil Chronican | December 2019 | Incumbent | |

=== Overview ===
The National Australia Bank Group is organised into eight divisions, spread across two geographic regions.

| Region | Division | Description |
|---|---|---|
| Australia | Business and Private Banking | Australia's largest business bank (by assets); Employees: 5,427; ~700,000 clients; 2022 cash earnings: A$3.013bn |
| Australia | Personal Banking | Australia's fourth largest retail bank; Employees: 8,706; ~3,000,000 customers (~100,000 UBank customers); Brands include: NAB Retail, UBank, 86 400, Homeside and Advantedge; 2022 cash earnings: A$1.591b |
| Australia | UBank & 86 400 | An internet centric direct bank with no physical branches; ~A$15bn deposits; ~600,000 customers |
| Australia | MLC & NAB Private Wealth | 5,909 employees; Investment, superannuation, insurance and private wealth solutions to individual investors and corporate customers; Brands include: MLC, JBWere, Navigator, Plum, JANA, NAB Private Wealth; 2011 cash earnings: A$533m; MLC Wealth (presented as a discontinued operation in 2022). |
| New Zealand | NZ Banking | Bank of New Zealand; Retail, business and agribusiness banking and insurance services; Employees: 4,641; ~1 million customers; 2022 cash earnings: A$1.295b |
| Global | Corporate and Institutional Banking | 2,889 employees located in Australia, New Zealand and Asia; Capabilities: capital markets, foreign exchange, derivatives, project finance, custodian services; Sector specialisations: Financial institutions, Infrastructure, Natural Resources; 2022 cash earnings: A$1.628b |
| Global | Specialised Group Assets | Bad bank containing approximately A$15 billion of exposures including CDOs and high yield debt; Created in aftermath of the 2008 financial crisis; Aim for orderly wind down of assets over time; 2011 cash earnings: A$110m |
| Global | Corporate Functions and Other | Includes the Group's operations in Asia, as well as Group Funding and other service functions; 2022 cash earnings: -A$423m |

=== Technology ===
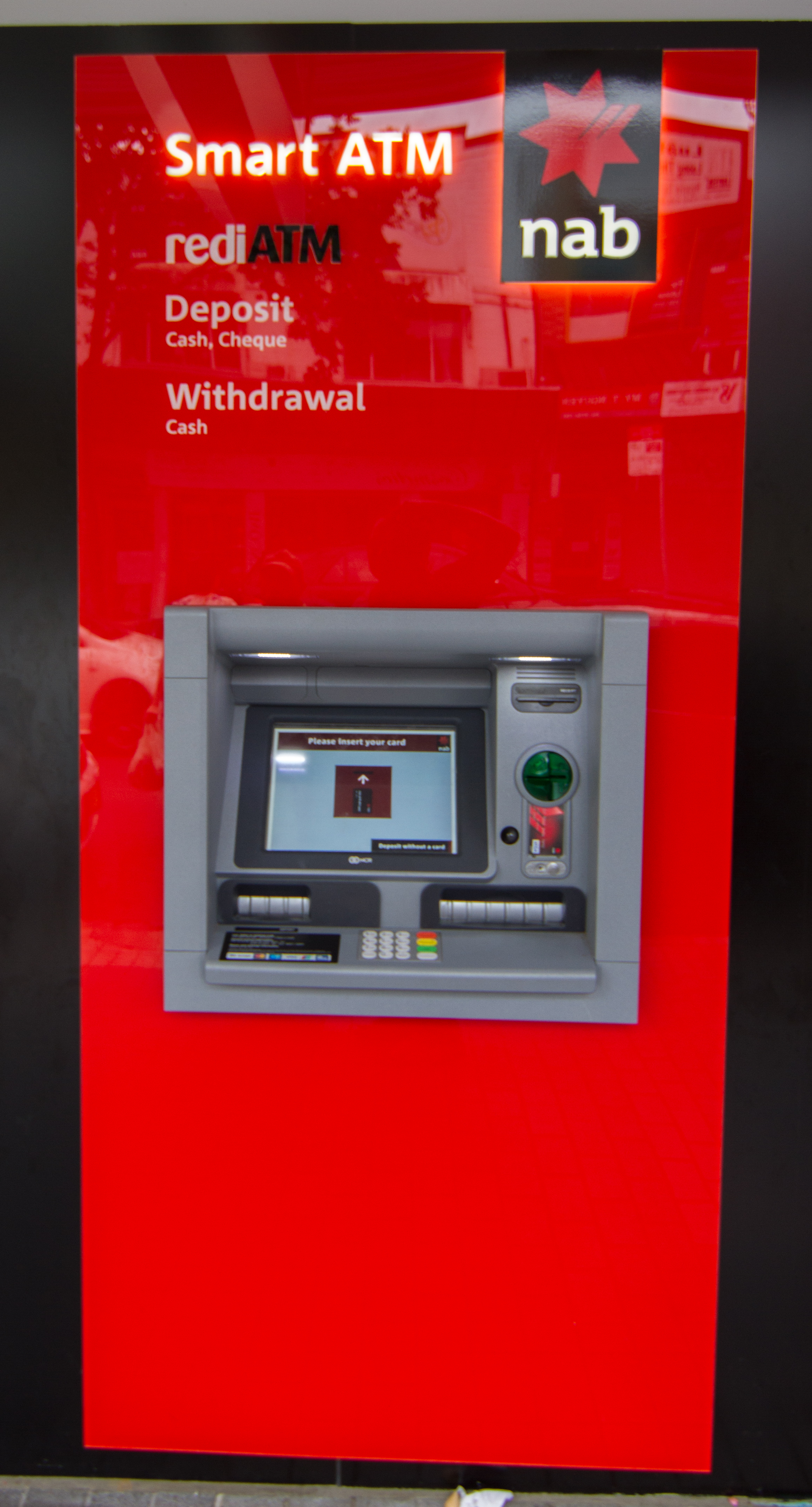
NAB bank ATM

NAB is a large user of the Siebel and Teradata CRM systems. While NAB has received recognition as an early adopter and leader in CRM (Customer Relationship Management) the system was reinvigorated in 2004–5 as part of the broader turnaround to support the new focus on cross-selling. In 2006, NAB was named the winner of the IFS/Cap Gemini Financial Innovation awards for its CRM system, internally called "National Leads".

On 25 November 2010, NAB suffered a system malfunction resulting in the failure of accounts processing. As a result, around 60,000 banking transactions were lost, and had to be manually recovered. The malfunction was caused by a corruption of an irreplaceable system file. This issue has been dubbed by some commentators as one of the biggest failures in the history of the Australian banking system.

Under Cameron Clyne's leadership, NAB began to upgrade its core banking platform in a project dubbed "NextGen". The project involves the replacement of its legacy systems which are up to 40 years old with an Oracle-based solution. UBank was reported to be the first beneficiary of this project. In total, the project was expected to be completed in 2014 and cost $1 billion. As of April 2014, NAB's "NextGen" program was said to suffer from "growing problems".

In July 2020, NAB signed an agreement with Microsoft to further develop its multi-cloud computing strategy including the migration of key applications to the cloud while accelerating development and innovation. In September 2020, The National Australia Bank partnered with crowdsource security firm Bugcrowd to launch a bug bounty program, which offers a reward to security researchers who can find previously unknown vulnerabilities in the bank's system. Would be participants must have an "Elite Trust Score" on Bugcrowd.

=== Corporate responsibility ===
In 2008, NAB invested $33.5 million in corporate responsibility initiatives. Its target is to spend 1% of cash earnings before tax in this area. In 2009, NAB became the largest Fairtrade accredited workplace in Australia through purchasing Fairtrade tea, coffee and hot chocolate for their offices and retail branches. In March 2010 NAB stated it expected to save nearly $1 million in annual power costs from a $6.5 million tri-generation plant at its main data centre. NAB became one of Australia's largest carbon neutral companies in September 2010. NAB ranked equal first among financial service companies in the Global 500 companies in the 2010 Carbon Disclosure Leadership Index.

=== Sponsorship and scholarships ===
In 2013 NAB emerged as a sponsor of Australian rules football, both at grassroots and elite level. It supports Auskick, an initiative to improve young footballers, as well as the NAB Cup (an Australian Football League pre-season competition), the NAB AFL Rising Star award; and the AFL National Draft. Other significant sporting sponsorships included the Socceroos, the 2006 Commonwealth Games, and was the main shirt sponsor of the South Sydney Rabbitohs between 2008 and 2010.

Support is also given towards community group volunteers around Australia. In recent years, NAB has provided financial support and relief to drought affected farmers and helped in the clean-up of flood affected in Queensland and Victoria. NAB has also sponsored the Sheikh Fehmi El-Imam Scholarship, designed to help strengthen the links between NAB and the Muslim community and enables an undergraduate student to continue post-graduate studies in finance and economics.

The National Australia Bank is the AFL Women's current and inaugural naming rights partner.

== Controversies ==
=== Foreign currency trader staff fraud ===
In 2004, NAB discovered that as a result of unauthorised spot trades on its foreign currency options desk, losses totalling A$360 million had been covered up. Investigations by PricewaterhouseCoopers and the Australian Prudential Regulation Authority highlighted a need for cultural change. The losses were a result of a failed speculative position where the traders falsified profits to trigger bonuses over a number of years. In order to actually generate the reported profits, the traders speculated on the US dollar, betting that it would rise against the Australian dollar and other currencies. In 2006, two former NAB foreign currency options traders were sentenced on charges brought by the Australian Securities and Investments Commission (ASIC) and incurred jail terms.

=== Financial planner misconduct ===
Acting on a customer complaint, an Australian Securities & Investment Commission (ASIC) investigation found that between 1997 and 2001, a NAB financial products seller, Paul Drakos, working out of a northern Sydney branch at Hornsby made recommendations to a number of NAB clients, mostly retirees, to invest in BSI Corp, an entity based in the Bahamas which was not a NAB approved investment product. According to ASIC, at least $6.2m was subsequently transferred from the overseas accounts in the Bahamas and the Dominican Republic back to a private company account, held for Strategic Investments Group ACN 080 924 036 and controlled by a single director, the same Paul Drakos. Funds were then applied from this account as loans disguised as investments to a number of failed business opportunities among his familial associates including a golf driving range on the Central Coast of NSW, a plumbing business, and futures and commodities trading. The land holdings, as inflated securities, were also used by the failed Allco Hit.

The NAB employee was not officially connected with BSI but gave instructions to agents based in Canada to arrange for the transfer of funds back to Strategic Investments Group and other accounts. On 29 May 2006 the NAB employee pleaded guilty to 8 counts of dishonestly obtaining a financial advantage by deception, 2 counts of fraudulent misappropriation and 3 counts of making and using false documents. There is also a connection, not yet pursued by ASIC, to the collapse of the Allco HIT Ltd and Strategic Finances where it is suspected that the swampland was used to underpin financial dealings. During the time of the investigations the NAB provided the perpetrator of the fraud with a loan of $350,000 secured by swampland on the Central Coast of NSW.

=== Ex-Chief of Staff and accomplice defraud ===
More than $5.5 million in inflated invoices from an event and function company Human Group were paid between 2014 and 2017 to Rosemary Rogers, an NAB employee for more than twenty years, nine of which was as chief of staff to CEOs Cameron Clyne and Andrew Thorburn. The money was paid by a co-accused Helen Rosamond "as an inducement or reward to ensure that Human Group maintained a contract with NAB" according to court documents. The court was told by the prosecution Rogers was motivated by "greed, personal gain and self-gratification". In sentencing, Judge Paul Conlon said the benefits she received went "well beyond compensating family for any perceived neglect", and went onto say, "I find it absolutely staggering that this fraud were not detected by some appropriate system of internal auditing by NAB". An anonymous whistle-blower sent a letter to NAB executives in 2017, alleging "Rose" had been receiving money and gifts over a number of years from Ms Rosamond. In sentencing, Rogers is to serve at least four years and nine months of her sentence being eligible for parole in October, 2025. Her co-accused is yet to be sentenced.

=== Tax evasion and customer overcharging in Ireland ===
The Irish subsidiary of the bank, National Irish Bank was the subject of a six-year Inquiry carried out by Inspectors appointed by the Irish High Court. They established that National Irish Bank had engaged in overcharging its own customers and tax evasion schemes prior to 1998. Mr Justice Peter Kelly, an Irish High Court judge commented following publication of the Report "The edifice of banking is built on a foundation of trust. On the Inspectors findings there was a breach of trust. The operation was carried out over a period of years in a deliberate fashion". The Director of Corporate Enforcement subsequently applied to the High Court to have 9 senior managers barred from being an officer of any company.

=== HomeSide write-downs ===
NAB booked two write-downs associated with HomeSide. First, in July 2001, NAB had a $450 million write down of the value of its capitalised mortgage servicing rights (CMSRs) during the quarter ending 30 June 2001, and was the result of exceptionally high mortgage refinance volumes which lowered the value of the CMSRs, combined with a more challenging capital markets environment in which to hedge interest rate risk. This was followed shortly by a second write-down reported in September totalling $1.75 billion; this second write-down consisted of US$400 million from an incorrect interest rate assumption embedded in the mortgage servicing rights valuation model, US$760 million from changed assumptions in the model flowing from the continued unprecedented uncertainty and turbulence in the mortgage servicing market, and US$590 million from writing off of the goodwill. In total, NAB booked $2.2 billion in losses due to HomeSide.

As a result of all these events, NAB's Australian shareholders attempted to sue it in the United States for securities fraud, even though the plaintiffs, the defendant, and the actual securities at issue (NAB's shares) were all located in Australia. (The main advantage of suing in the U.S. arises from Basic Inc. v. Levinson (1988), under which it is presumed that the defendant committed "fraud-on-the-market" unless the defendant proves otherwise.) The case of Morrison v. National Australia Bank Ltd ultimately ended up before the U.S. Supreme Court, which held in a unanimous 8–0 decision on 24 June 2010 that U.S. law against securities fraud does not apply to securities deals occurring outside of the country.

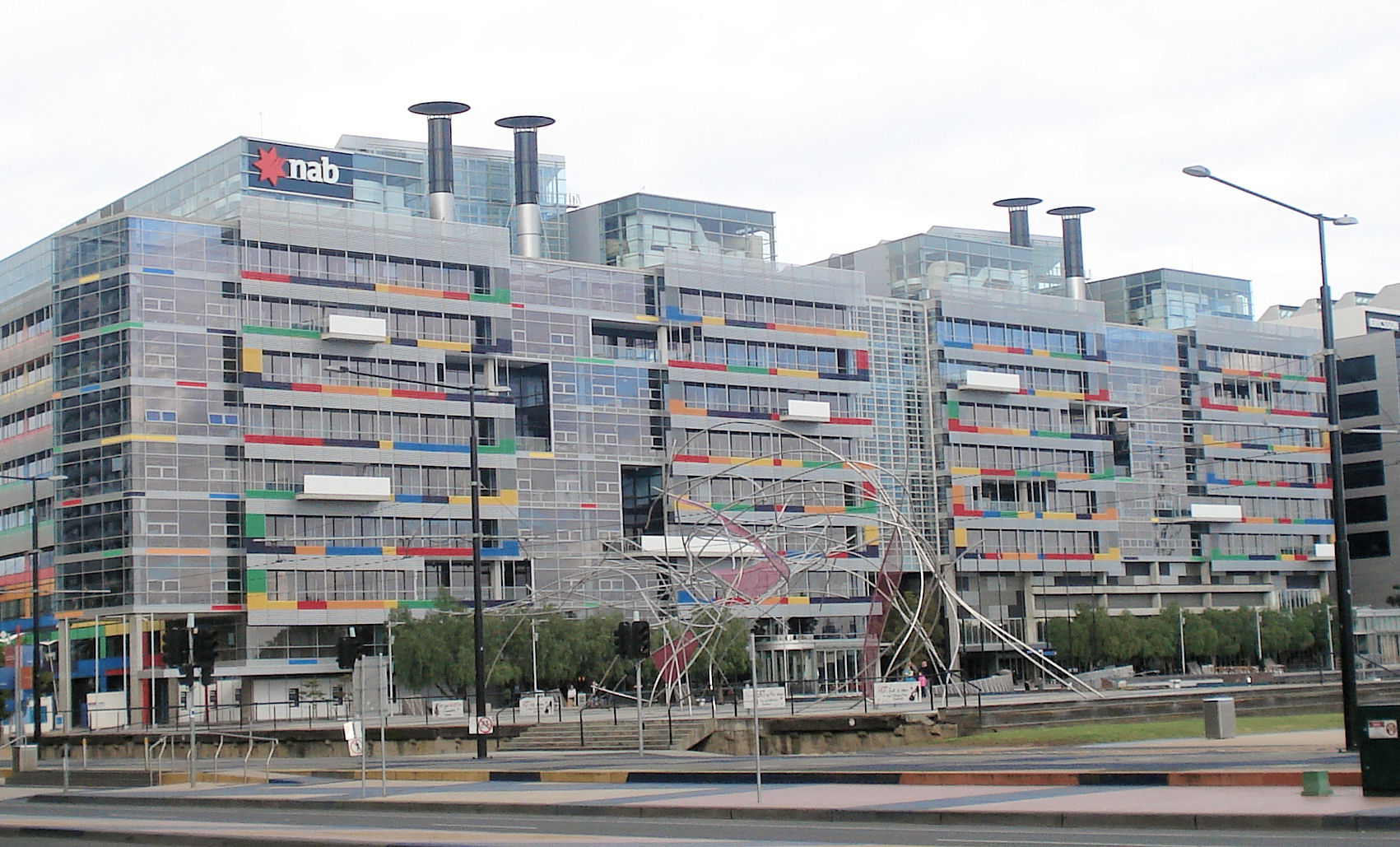
Former headquarters at 800 Bourke Street, Docklands

=== Financing of fossil fuel operations ===
On 5 Nov 2015, NAB publicly supported the climate goals of the Paris Agreement. In the four years following this commitment, from 2016 to 2019, NAB loaned A$7.3 billion to the fossil fuel industry. Despite evidence that there can be little or no development of new or expansionary fossil fuel projects if the Paris Agreement climate goals are to be met, NAB loaned A$1.2 billion to such projects during 2016–2019. Over the same timeframe, NAB loaned A$1.1 billion to ten companies that were expanding the scale of the fossil fuel sector and/or relying on scenarios consistent with the failure of the Paris Agreement to justify their future business prospects.

Despite publicly committing to “no longer finance new thermal coal mining projects” in December 2017, the bank reportedly funded New Hope Group for its development of the New Acland Stage 3 Coal Mine, and Coronado Global Resources in connection with an expansion of its Curragh coal mine. Environmental groups have questioned whether NAB breached its thermal coal commitment by providing this funding.

In November 2019, NAB announced it would exit the thermal coal sector by 2035, attracting criticism on the basis that this is five years too late to be considered compatible with the Paris Agreement climate goals.

The Australian investor community has had various responses to continued financing of fossil fuel projects by NAB and the other members of the Big Four banks. These responses include:

- NAB customers moving their money to banks with a lesser financed emissions portfolio.
- NAB shareholders asking for greater emissions disclosure and reduced finance for fossil fuels, including by lodging and supporting shareholder resolutions.
- Protest groups covering ATM screens to raise awareness of financed projects’ associated climate impacts and degradation of
- The creation of 'fossil fuel-free' superannuation and investment products which exclude NAB from the investment universe.

=== Hayne Royal Commission ===
A royal commission was established on in December 2017 to inquire into and report on misconduct in the banking, superannuation, and financial services industry. The establishment of the commission followed revelations in the media of a culture of greed within several Australian financial institutions. A subsequent parliamentary inquiry recommended a royal commission, noting the lack of regulatory intervention by the relevant government authorities, and later revelations that financial institutions were involved in money laundering for drug syndicates, turned a blind eye to terrorism financing, and ignored statutory reporting responsibilities and impropriety in foreign exchange trading.

During the Royal Commission, it was revealed that NAB subsidiary, MLC Limited, had charged some of its customers "adviser contribution fees" and "employer service fees" on its superannuation products. By its own admission, NAB executives told the Royal Commission that the customers might have not received any service, in spite of being charged a fee. NAB tried to disguise these fees as commissions. The following month ASIC commenced civil proceedings in the Federal Court alleging that NAB-owned superannuation entities had deducted $100 million in fees from more than 300,000 customers where services were not provided. Appearing before the Royal Commission in November 2018, NAB Chief Executive Officer Andrew Thorburn defended the fees-for-no-service issue as a "process issue" rather than dishonesty. Days earlier, NAB Chairman and former Secretary of The Treasury Ken Henry defensively appeared before the Royal Commission, with some tense exchanges between Henry and legal counsel Rowena Orr.

== See also ==
- Banking in Australia
- Dan Saunders ATM glitch
- List of banks
- List of banks in Australia
- List of banks in Oceania
