= Alex Bank =

New Australian digital bank

- Industry: Banking
- Founded: July 2018; 8 years ago in Brisbane, Australia
- Founder: Simon Beitz and Craig Fenwick
- Headquarters: Brisbane, Queensland, Australia
- Website: alex.bank

Alex Bank is an Australian digital bank. It is based in Brisbane, Queensland. It offers deposit products, including term deposits, and consumer lending products, including personal and vehicle loans.

The company was founded in 2018 by Simon Beitz and Craig Fenwick. It was granted a restricted authorised deposit-taking institution licence by the Australian Prudential Regulation Authority in July 2021. In December 2022 the Australian Prudential Regulation Authority announced that it had granted the Bank its full authorised deposit-taking licence.

== History ==
Alex Bank was established in 2018 by two ex-Suncorp executives, Simon Beitz and Craig Fenwick. At its founding, Beitz was named Chief executive officer and Fenwick Chief financial officer. The bank initially targeted 18-to-30 year-olds in the autumn of 2020, with the idea that they are more comfortable with the idea of a fully-digital bank.

The company launched its banking services late in 2020 after a trial period in 2019. In July 2021, Alex Bank was granted a restricted authorised deposit-taking institution licence by the Australian Prudential Regulation Authority. The licence permitted the company to take deposits of up to $250,000 AUD from public borrowers, but placed limitations on the range of products and services it could offer. Alex Bank was one of only two Australian financial institutions to be granted a restricted authorised deposit-taking institution licence at the time.

The bank had raised approximately $55 million AUD in capital as of September 2021, chiefly from private (mostly Australian) investors.

In December 2022 the Australian Prudential Regulation Authority announced that it had granted Alex Bank its authorised deposit-taking licence.

In 2023, the bank expanded its deposit offering with online term deposits, following its unrestricted ADI licence. In March, it began a capital raise targeting A$20 million to fund growth across lending and deposits. It launched term deposits on Temenos Banking Cloud, following a rapid deployment with Temenos.

Alex Bank’s term deposit product received ‘Term Deposit Account of the Year’ and ‘Best for Value Term Deposit’ at the 2023 WeMoney Banking Awards.

In July of 2023, Alex Bank CEO Simon Beitz stated that long term Alex Bank would find its way onto the Australian Securities Exchange.

In 2024, Alex Bank partnered with Qantas Frequent Flyer to offer Qantas Points on eligible term deposits and loan products.

In 2025, Alex Bank joined the Reserve Bank of Australia’s Reserve Bank Information and Transfer System (RITS) as an Exchange Settlement Account (ESA) holder.

== Products ==
Alex Bank offers consumer lending products including personal loans, green loans, car loans, and electric vehicle loans.

It also offers deposit products including term deposits, and a savings account offering that has at times been released on a limited basis.

The company differentiated itself from other banks by waiving establishment fees, ongoing fees, payout penalties or extra-repayment fees on its loans.

== Awards ==
In 2023, Alex Bank's term deposit product was named “Term Deposit Account of the Year” and “Best for Value Term Deposit” at the WeMoney Banking Awards.

The bank's products have continued to receive recognition in subsequent years, including additional awards for term deposits and personal lending products.

== See also ==
- Banking in Australia
- List of banks
- List of banks in Australia
- List of banks in Oceania
