= Up (Australian bank) =

Australian neobank

Up Money Pty Ltd
- Type: Private
- Industry: Banking
- Founded: 2018; 8 years ago
- Headquarters: Melbourne, Australia
- Area served: Australia
- Key people: Xavier Shay (CEO); Dominic Pym (Co-founder); Marnie Baker (MD)
- Parent: Bendigo & Adelaide Bank
- Website: up.com.au

Up, also known as Up Money, Up Bank, or Up Banking, is an Australian neobank based in Melbourne, Victoria with more than 1 million self-reported customers. Founded in 2018, Up was created as a collaboration between software development company Ferocia and Bendigo & Adelaide Bank.

== History ==
Up was founded in 2018 as a collaboration between software company Ferocia and Bendigo & Adelaide Bank. The companies were already closely tied as Ferocia was building Bendigo Bank's app at the time.

On 13 May 2018, Up started its friends and family beta phase with a closed beta release on 2 August 2018. An invite system was introduced on 1 October 2018 to allow existing users to invite friends to sign-up, which allowed invitees to skip the waitlist before Up officially launched to the public on 9 October 2018.

On 8 November 2018, Up was officially the first neobank in Australia to provide instant Apple Pay provisioning, allowing consumers to add their card to their Apple Wallet before receiving their physical card. Bank transfers via the Pay ID were then enabled on 21 November 2018 to a small group of users before having a full rollout on 13 December 2018. The bank then teamed up with buy now, pay later company Afterpay, allowing users to link their app with Afterpay thus providing "smarter transaction viewing" as well as reminders on when their next payments were due.

Four months after their public launch, Up announced that it had 30,000 customers. On 12 June 2019, Up announced that they had reached 100,000 customers.

Gamification via the Pull to Save feature was released on 14 March 2019, allowing customers to "pull" their screen and with one touch, round-up spare change to savings. On the next day, Up announced support for WatchOS and released their first Apple Watch app. Samsung Pay support was then released on 10 April 2019. On 18 June 2019, Up announced that it had also rolled out instant Google Pay provisioning, one of the first banks in Australia to do so.

Scheduled and repeated payments as well as a new Salary Identification feature were then released on 10 September 2019. On 15 October 2019, the bank announced a partnership with international payments service TransferWise via the "TransferWise for Banks" model with a private beta for November and an expected public release in Q4 of 2019. This makes Up Banking the first in the Asia-Pacific region to integrate TransferWise APIs. On 16 October 2019, Up held its first meetup in Fitzroy, Victoria and announced features such as salary splitting and transactional-saving covering.

On 16 August 2021, shortly after Up grew to 400,000 customers, Up announced the successful merging of its founding partners, with Bendigo & Adelaide Bank acquiring Ferocia, including the remaining stake in Up and Ferocia's IP. Up now operates as an independent arm of Bendigo & Adelaide Bank.

In 2022, Up entered the home loan market.

== Products ==
Up offers transaction, savings accounts, and home loans which customers can apply for and managed via a mobile app, including features such as automatic rounding-up to savings, analysis of spending patterns and locations, and payments displayed in a conversational format.

== Awards ==
Up won "Exceptional Everyday Account" and "Regular Savers" awards from Mozo's annual Expert Choice Deposit Awards for 2019. Up qualified and won "Digital Disrupter of the Year", "Best Tech Innovation" and "Best Banking Innovation" awards from the 2019 Finder Awards.

In 2021, Ferocia was listed as Australia's 8th Best Place to Work in technology, and Up was chosen as a brand to watch by Interbrand.

== See also ==
- Banking in Australia
- List of banks
- List of banks in Australia
- List of banks in Oceania
