= Hume Bank =

Banks of Australia

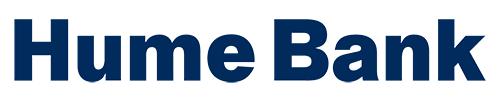
- Company type: Consumers' co-operative
- Industry: Banking
- Founded: 1955
- Headquarters: Albury, New South Wales, Australia
- Key people: Stephen Capello, (Chief executive); Michael Gobel, (Chairperson, non-executive Director)
- Products: Consumer Banking; Business Banking; Wealth Management; Insurance; Travel
- Number of employees: over 140

Hume Bank is an Australian bank. Headquartered in Albury, New South Wales, it is a customer-owned bank that started as a building society in 1955. Its business focus is on retail banking and assisting local economic development.

== About Hume ==
Hume Bank, previously Hume Building Society, is a customer-owned bank which operates primarily in retail banking. Hume has an extensive branch and ATM network and employs over 150 staff. In 2023 Hume's customer base reached 65,000 and its assets stood at A$1.70bn.

Hume Bank uses local suppliers and businesses to support important economic activity in the region and offers exclusive workplace packages to employees of local businesses.

Hume Bank's Chief Executive Officer is Stephen Capello (June 2018), its chair Michael Gobel (December 2020).

== Company history ==
Hume started as the Hume Co-operative Building & Investment Society Ltd. and was registered on 4 April 1955. Hume was founded by a group of Albury residents who were dissatisfied with the availability of funds for housing and wanted to help local people purchase their own homes. Hume provided a local alternative for housing finance, something that was becoming increasingly difficult for prospective homeowners to find because of regulatory rationing.

Hume officially changed its name to Hume Bank on 1 July 2014 after seeking approval from its customers and the governing body APRA in 2013. The name change reflects the banking products and services Hume now offers. Hume continues to be customer owned.

== Key dates ==
1955 – Hume Co-operative Building & Investment Society Ltd. was founded by a group of locals – a dentist, a farmer, a priest, businessmen and a solicitor – who wanted to help people in the community purchase their own homes at a time when funds were scarce.

1989 – Hume changes its name to 'Hume Building Society'.

1989 – Hume introduces Australia's first ATMs in a workplace at Uncle Ben's and the Australian Newsprint Mill.

2006 – Hume launches its first online only account, iSave.

2010 – Hume and Baker Motors lease the first fully electric vehicle on the Border of Victoria and NSW.

2012 – Hume reaches 55,000 customers.

2013 – Customers vote for Hume to become a bank from 1 July 2014.

2014 – Hume gains APRA approval to become a bank on 4 April 2014.

2014 – Hume changes its name to Hume Bank on 1 July 2014.

== See also ==
- Banking in Australia
- List of banks
- List of banks in Australia
- List of banks in Oceania
