= Police Bank =

Mutual bank owned by law enforcement staff in Australia

Police Bank Ltd
- Company type: Mutual bank
- Industry: Financial services
- Founded: 1964
- Headquarters: Sydney; Australia
- Key people: Greg McKenna, Chief Executive Officer; P Remfrey Chairman; R Del Vecchio, Deputy Chairman; C J Dyson, Director; M Fuller, Director; D Hudson, Director; R Redfern, Director; S Waterhouse, Director
- Products: Banking; Investment; Insurance; Financial Planning; Credit Cards; Mortgages
- Total assets: ▲ A$2 billion (2019)
- Members: 76,470
- Number of employees: 168
- Website: policebank.com.au

Police Bank Limited is an Australian member-owned mutual bank. Founded as NSW Police Credit Union (PCU) on 24 October 1964 by a group of officers from the Clarence Street Police Station in Sydney, its members passed a resolution to enable "Police Credit Union" to become "Police Bank Ltd." on 3 December 2012.

Membership with Police Bank is open to employees and their relatives, as well as friends of the NSW Police Force, Australian Federal Police, Emergency Management Australia, Corrective Services NSW, Australian Courts, or any other area of law enforcement and associated services. Police Bank also offers membership to employees of the Australian Customs and Border Protection Service as well as Australian Quarantine and Inspection Service under their "Customs Bank" subsidiary.

Police Bank is a member of The Customer Owned Banking Association, the industry body representing the Australian mutual and cooperative banking sector. Police Bank is a member-owned institution and has no shareholders.

Police Bank is supervised by the Australian Prudential Regulation Authority (APRA), and is among the 21 Australian-owned banks.

== Sponsorship ==
Police Bank runs a sponsorship program providing financial support to the police community and to charitable sporting organisations.

Police Bank is a major sponsor of NSW Police Legacy, which provides support to the families of deceased and terminally ill police officers. Police Bank also provides NSW Police Legacy financial and corporate support. They are a major sponsor of the NSW Police Games, an annual competitive athletic event incorporating sports from a number of NSW Police Sporting Clubs.

== See also ==
- Banking in Australia
- List of banks
- List of banks in Australia
- List of banks in Oceania
