= IMB Bank =

Other organization in Wollongong, Australia

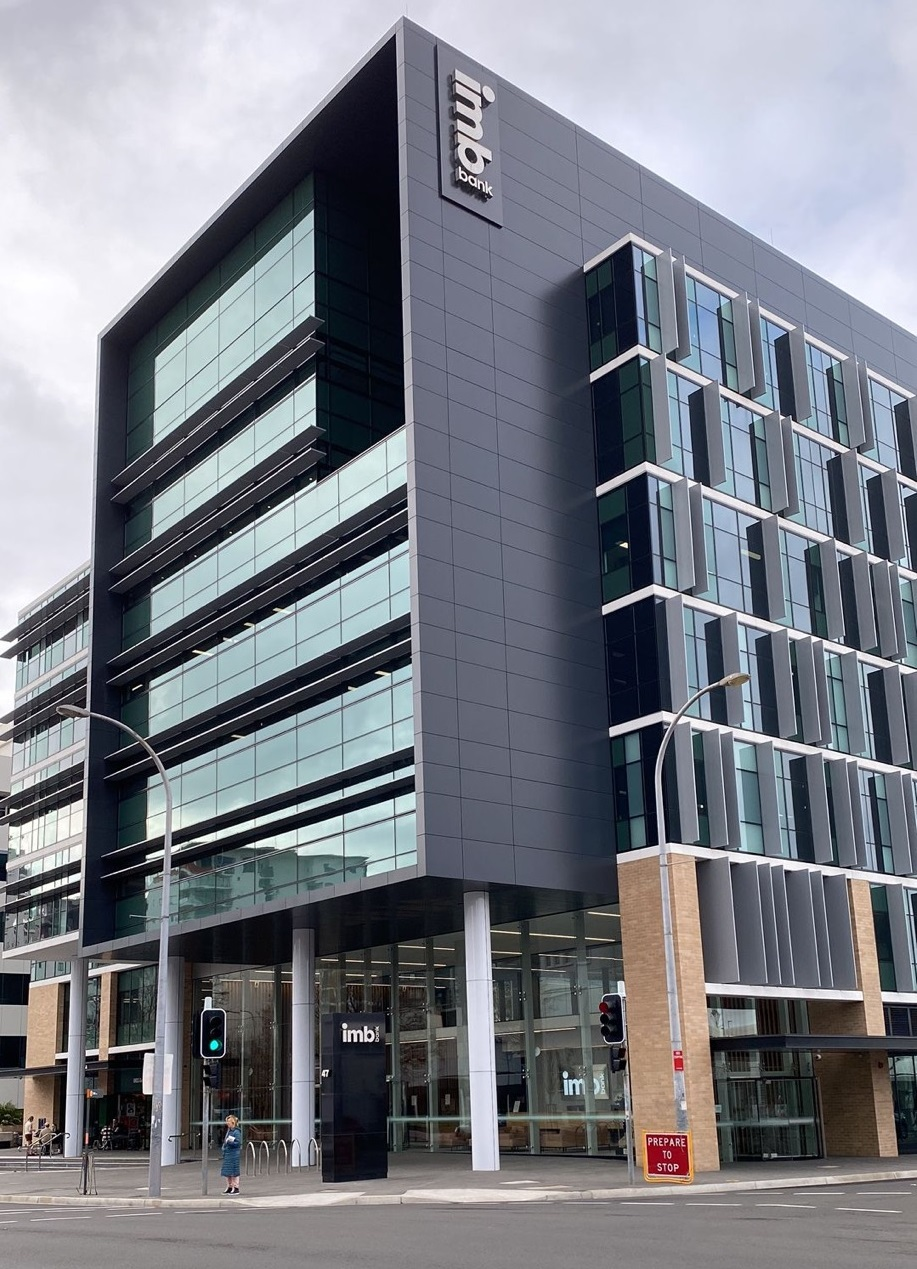
- Company type: Bank (Mutual)
- Industry: Banking and financial services
- Founded: 1880
- Headquarters: Wollongong, Australia
- Products: Personal Banking, Business Banking
- Website: www.imb.com.au

IMB Bank is an Australian mutual bank established in 1880. In 2020, IMB Bank was voted by Forbes as one of the World's Best Banks, and, in 2022, was found by financial services research company Canstar to have Australia's Most Satisfied Customers for both the Bank and Mutual Bank categories.

IMB Bank has over $7.3b in assets and is regulated by the Australian Prudential Regulation Authority, (APRA). It is a member of the Customer Owned Banking Association (COBA), an independent organisation representing mutual banks, building societies and credit unions.

== History ==
IMB Bank was established in 1880 in the port community of Wollongong, 85km south of Sydney. It began life as the Illawarra Mutual Building Society, with the express purpose of “enabling people to become their own landlords”.

It grew throughout southern New South Wales over subsequent decades, entering the Sydney market in 1989, Melbourne in 2006 and, after a successful merger with the Hunter United Credit Union, the Newcastle/Hunter Region in 2020.

IMB became a mutual bank in 2015, formally rebranding as IMB Bank.

== Products and services ==
IMB provides members with retail banking (home and personal lending, savings and transaction accounts, term deposits) and business banking products, and access to general insurance and financial planning services.

IMB Bank customers have access to internet, phone and app banking, supported by an Australian-based contact centre, located at the company's head office in Wollongong. The bank has an extensive branch network, currently numbering 52 across NSW, the ACT and Melbourne.

== Community Support ==
IMB Bank has a history of community support and engagement. This includes sponsorship of sporting competitions, civic groups and projects, community events and initiatives, local business advocacy and awards, and more.

== IMB Bank Community Foundation ==
Established in 1999, the IMB Bank Community Foundation provides annual grants to community and volunteer groups in the not-for-profit sector, in the areas where the bank operates.

Since inception, the foundation has donated over $11 million to more than 850 not-for-profit and charity groups. The nature of projects the program funds varies from year-to year and are assessed by a committee-approval process.

== See also ==
- Banking in Australia
- List of banks
- List of banks in Australia
- List of banks in Oceania
- List of oldest companies in Australia
