= Cairns Bank =

Australian financial institution

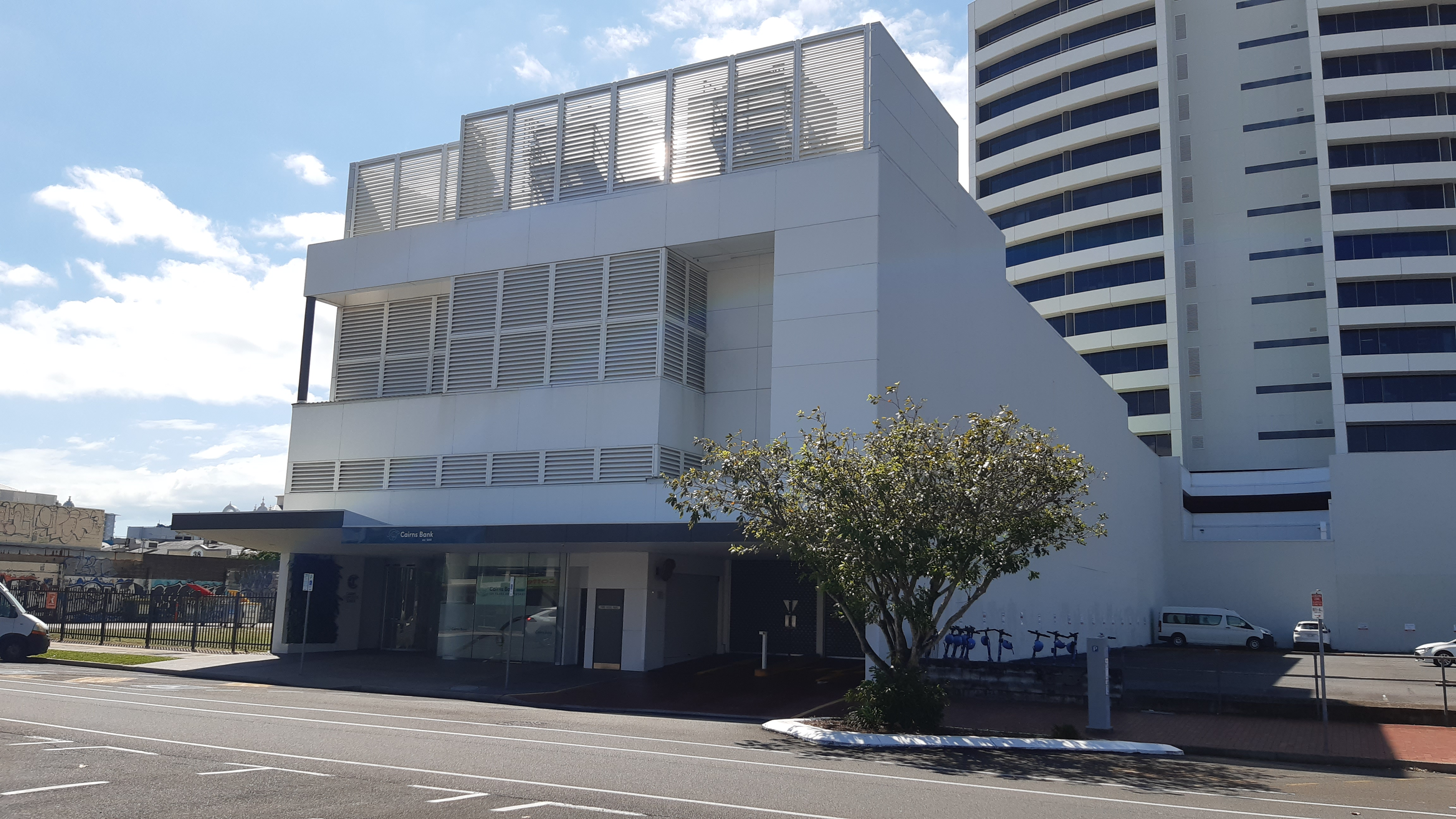
Cairns Bank, Grafton Street, Cairns

Cairns Bank (formerly and commonly known as "Cairns Penny") is an Australian financial institution, operating primarily in retail banking. It is owned by its customers. It was established in April 1899.

Cairns Bank operates a single outlet at 24 Grafton Street, Cairns City, Queensland (16.9256°S 145.7773°E).

== History ==
On Saturday 22 April 1899, the Cairns Penny Savings Bank opened for the first time. On the first day 86 accounts were opened and a total of £17/1/9 was deposited with the smallest deposit being one penny.

Over the years, the bank has undergone various transformations and name changes due to legislative changes. These are summarised below:

Name	Years	Cause of change
Cairns Weekly Penny Savings Bank	April 1899–1946	
The Cairns Cooperative Weekly Penny Savings Bank	1946–1987	Cooperative Societies Act
Cairns Penny Bank	1987–2004	
Cairns Penny Savings & Loan Limited	2004–2020	Banking Act (QLD) 2004
Cairns Bank	2020–present	

== See also ==
- Banking in Australia
- List of banks
- List of banks in Australia
- List of banks in Oceania
- List of oldest companies in Australia
