= BankVic =

Australian member-owned mutual bank

- Company type: Bank
- Industry: Financial services
- Founded: 1974
- Headquarters: Melbourne; Australia
- Key people: Lucinda Nolan, Chair; Anthony De Fazio, Chief Executive Officer
- Products: Banking; Investment; Insurance; Financial Planning
- Total assets: ▲ A$ $3 billion (March 2024)
- Number of employees: 150
- Website: http://www.bankvic.com.au

BankVic is an Australian member-owned mutual bank. It was founded as the Police Association Credit Co Operative, commonly known as Police Credit or Police Credit Co-Op, by police officers in 1974 as a credit union. In 1979 membership was opened to include people working in Victoria's firefighting services. In 1992 membership was opened to emergency services sector, including ambulance workers, health workers and public sector employees.

In 2011, Police Credit reported that the organisation had 91,000 members, employed 120 staff and had $1 billion (Australian) in assets under management. In 2014, BankVic celebrated its 40th anniversary and is one of Victoria's largest Mutual Banks with assets in excess of $1.3B and over 97,000 members.

On 1 June 2013, Police Credit became BankVic (Police Financial Services Limited), with the shield and stars logo connecting the bank to its police heritage and the five member bonds.

The bank is wholly owned by its members, who are all equal shareholders. As a co-operative, it is not focused on profits or paying dividends to shareholders. All profits from the bank's products and services are reinvested into the organisation for members to directly benefit. Their key responsibility is to help members achieve a more secure financial future.

BankVic was awarded the 2014 Canstar Customer Owned Banking Institution of the Year, making it back to back winners after winning Money Magazine Credit Union of the year in 2013. The bank supports a wide variety of police, health and community organisations such as the Blue Ribbon Foundation and Limbs 4 Life.

In 2020 BankVic became a certified B Corp

== See also ==
- Banking in Australia
- List of banks
- List of banks in Australia
- List of banks in Oceania
