= List of banks in Australia =

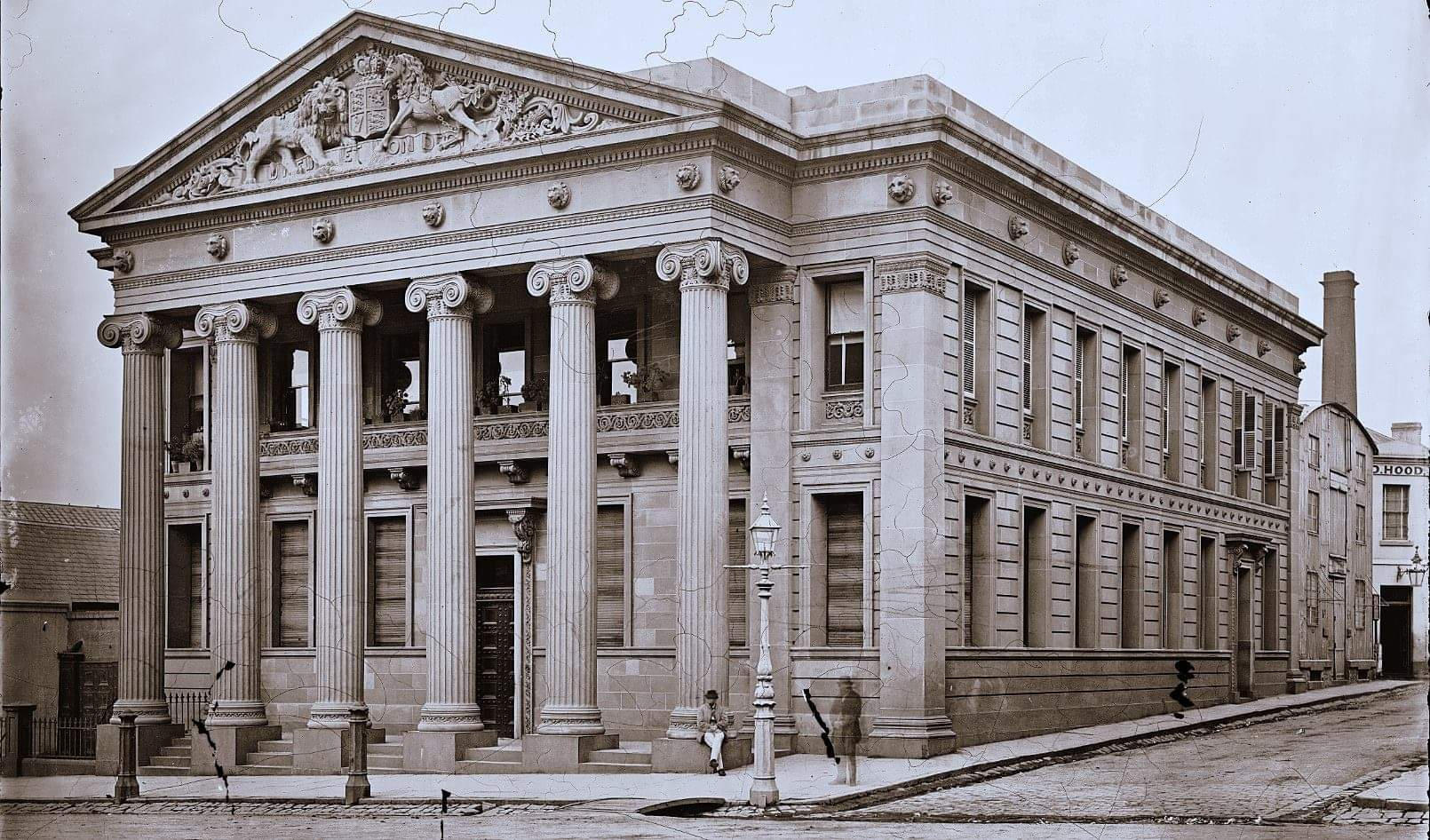
The Oriental Bank, one of Australia's earliest bank buildings, located in Melbourne, circa 1870s. The bank went out of business in around 1884 and was demolished shortly afterwards.

The following is the list of banks in Australia, as well as restricted authorised deposit-taking institutions (ADI), credit unions and subsidiaries and branches of foreign banks in Australia. Financial institutions in Australia are supervised by the Australian Prudential Regulation Authority (APRA) as authorised deposit-taking institutions (ADI) under the Banking Act 1959 (Cth), as at 2 August 2017.

== Central bank ==
The Reserve Bank of Australia (RBA) is Australia's central bank and banknote issuing authority. It has had this role since 14 January 1960, when the Reserve Bank Act 1959 removed the central banking functions from the Commonwealth Bank. The bank's main policy role is to control inflation levels within a target range of 2–3%, by controlling the unemployment rate according to the 'non-accelerating inflation rate of unemployment' (NAIRU) by controlling the official cash rate.

== Authorised deposit-taking institutions ==
Authorised Deposit-taking Institutions (ADIs) are corporations authorised to conduct banking business in Australia; however, the Financial Claims Scheme (FCS) guarantee applies exclusively to banks, building societies, and credit unions, and does not cover all ADI categories such as payment facilities.

=== Incorporated in Australia ===
According to APRA statistics as of 11 December 2025, there are 71 Australian-owned ADIs, along with seven foreign-owned banks that are locally incorporated in Australia. It is worth noting that several of these banking groups operate under multiple brand names.

Banks incorporated in Australia
Notes: OMB: Operating multiple brands. Refers to a bank's strategy of maintaining and operating two or more distinct consumer-facing brands, often following consolidation or the merger and acquisition of other banking institutions under a single operating license. BIG4: Big Four retail banking group in Australia. Bank: Special status. The bank is undergoing closure or acquisition/integration. For details, please refer to the Notes.
Domestic banks
No.	Bank name	Headquarters	Established	SWIFT-BIC
No.	Bank name	Notes		
1	Alex Bank	Brisbane	2018	
2	AMP Bank	Sydney	1849	AMPBAU2S
3	ANZ^{BIG4}	Melbourne	1835	ANZBAU3M
3	ANZ^{BIG4}	Australia and New Zealand Banking Group (ANZ) was officially formed in 1970 through the then-largest bank merger in Australian history, combining the Australia and New Zealand Bank (itself formed by the 1951 merger of the Bank of Australasia and Union Bank of Australia) with the English, Scottish & Australian Bank (ES&A). ANZ has aggressively expanded its footprint, particularly in New Zealand, where it acquired the government-owned PostBank in 1989 and, most significantly, the National Bank of New Zealand in 2003 from Lloyds TSB. While the National Bank brand was initially retained, it was retired in 2012, unifying operations under the ANZ brand. Continuing its strategy of growth through acquisition, ANZ recently strengthened its domestic position by acquiring Suncorp Bank in 2024, specifically targeting its mortgage and deposit base in Queensland.		
4	Australian Settlements	Sydney	1993	ASLLAU2C
5	Avenue Bank	Sydney	2021	
6	Bank of Queensland^{OMB} including BOQ Specialist (BOQS) and ME Bank	Brisbane	1863	QBANAU4B
7	Bendigo Bank^{OMB} formerly the Bendigo & Adelaide Bank, including Rural Bank and Up Bank	Bendigo	1858	BENDAU3B
8	BNK Banking Corporation^{OMB} including Goldfields Money	Perth	1982	GOMNAU61
9	Commonwealth Bank^{BIG4 OMB} including Bankwest	Sydney	1911	CTBAAU2S
9	Commonwealth Bank^{BIG4 OMB} including Bankwest	Commonwealth Bank of Australia (CBA), established in 1911 as a government-owned bank, is the nation's largest financial institution and the only one of the "Big Four" to have been fully privatized (a process completed in 1996). While CBA grew significantly through earlier mergers, such as acquiring the State Bank of Victoria in 1991, its most pivotal modern expansion occurred during the Global Financial Crisis in 2008. Taking advantage of market volatility, CBA acquired Bankwest (the Bank of Western Australia) from the distressed UK lender HBOS for A$2.1 billion. This acquisition cemented CBA market dominance in Western Australia, allowing Bankwest to operate as a distinct regional brand until its strategic transition in 2024 to become a digital-only division within the group.		
10	Cuscal	Sydney	1966	CUSCAU2S
11	IN1Bank	Sydney	2019	
12	Indue	Brisbane	1965	IDLTAU42
13	Judo Bank	Melbourne	2016	
14	Macquarie Bank	Sydney	1969	MACQAU2S
14	Macquarie Bank	Macquarie Group originated in 1969 as Hill Samuel Australia, the local subsidiary of a UK merchant bank - Hill Samuel & Co, before obtaining a full Australian banking license and rebranding to Macquarie Bank in 1985. Unlike the retail-focused "Big Four," Macquarie built its reputation as a global leader in infrastructure asset management and investment banking (often dubbed the "Millionaire's Factory"). A pivotal moment in its domestic history was the 1999 acquisition of the investment banking assets of Bankers Trust Australia, which eliminated a key rival and solidified its local dominance. Internationally, Macquarie aggressively expanded its funds management capabilities, most notably through the acquisition of US-based Delaware Investments in 2010 and Waddell & Reed in 2021, transforming it into a top-tier global asset manager.		
15	Members Banking Group trading as RACQ Bank	Brisbane	1965	QTMBAU41
16	MyState Bank	Hobart	2009	MYSTAU71
17	National Australia Bank^{BIG4 OMB} including Ubank	Melbourne	1982	NATAAU33
17	National Australia Bank^{BIG4 OMB} including Ubank	National Australia Bank (NAB) was formed in 1982 through the merger of the National Bank of Australasia and the Commercial Banking Company of Sydney. Historically, NAB pursued an aggressive international expansion strategy, most notably in the United Kingdom where it acquired Clydesdale Bank (1987) and Yorkshire Bank (1990). However, following a strategic shift to refocus on its core domestic franchise, NAB fully divested its UK operations in 2016 through the demerger of CYBG (now Virgin Money UK). In the domestic digital market, NAB launched UBank in 2008 as a branchless division. This digital presence was significantly upgraded in 2021 when NAB acquired the neobank 86 400 for approximately A$220 million, merging it with UBank to leverage 86 400’s modern technology stack while retiring the neobank's brand.		
18	Norfina trading as Suncorp Bank	Brisbane	1902	METWAU4B
18	Norfina trading as Suncorp Bank	Following the completion of its acquisition of Suncorp Bank in July 2024, ANZ Group (ANZBGL) committed to maintaining the Suncorp brand for at least five to seven years and operating the bank as a stand-alone entity under its own ADI licence, with plans to eventually surrender the licence and fully integrate the business into the ANZBGL’s ADI licence.		
19	Tyro Payments	Sydney	2003	TYROAU22
20	Westpac^{BIG4 OMB} including Bank of Melbourne, BankSA and St George Bank	Sydney	1817	WPACAU2S
20	Westpac^{BIG4 OMB} including Bank of Melbourne, BankSA and St George Bank	Westpac, established in 1817 as the Bank of New South Wales (Australia first bank), cemented its position as one of the "Big Four" through a strategic history of acquisitions that created a multi-brand banking group. After rebranding to Westpac in 1982, the corporation significantly expanded its regional footprint by acquiring the Bank of Melbourne in 1997. This was followed by a major merger with St.George Bank in 2008, a deal that also secured ownership of BankSA (which St. George had acquired in 1997), effectively bringing these major regional brands under the singular Westpac Group umbrella while retaining their local identities.		
Foreign subsidiary banks
No.	Bank name	Headquarters	Established	SWIFT-BIC
No.	Bank name	Notes		
21	Arab Bank Australia	Sydney	1986	ARABAU2S
22	Bank of China (Australia)	Sydney	2005	BKCHAU2A
23	Bank of Sydney	Sydney	2001	LIKIAU2S
24	Heartland Bank Australia	Melbourne	1971	
25	HSBC Bank Australia	Sydney	1985	HKBAAU2S
25	HSBC Bank Australia	HSBC has initiated a strategic review of its retail banking operations in Australia that is widely expected to lead to a market exit, although the bank clarified that no final decision has been reached and its wholesale banking business will remain unchanged.		
26	ING Bank (Australia) trading as ING	Sydney	1999	INGBAU2S
27	Rabobank Australia	Sydney	1994	RABOAU2B
Mutual banks
No.	Bank name	Headquarters	Established	SWIFT-BIC
No.	Bank name	Notes		
28	Australian Military Bank^{OMB} including RSL Money	Sydney	1959	AUMLAU21
29	Australian Mutual Bank^{OMB} including Endeavour Mutual Bank and Sydney Mutual Bank	Sydney	1953	SYCUAU21
30	B&E trading as Bank of us	Launceston	1870	BETDAU71
31	Bank Australia including Qudos Bank	Melbourne	1957	MCUUAU31
32	Beyond Bank Australia	Adelaide	1958	CPSUAU51
33	Defence Bank	Melbourne	1959	DEFEAU31
34	Gateway Bank	Sydney	1955	GCRUAU21
35	Heritage and People's Choice^{OMB} trading as Heritage Bank, including People's Choice Credit Union and People First Bank	Toowoomba / Adelaide	1875	HBSLAU4T
36	Hume Bank	Albury	1955	HUMEAU21
37	IMB^{OMB} trading as IMB Bank, including The Shire	Wollongong	1880	IMTIAU21
38	Maitland Mutual trading as The Mutual Bank	Maitland	1888	MMBTAU21
39	Newcastle Greater Mutual Group^{OMB} including Newcastle Permanent and Greater Bank	Newcastle	2023	ASLLAU2C
40	Police & Nurses^{OMB} trading as P&N Bank, including BCU Bank	Perth	1990	PLNSAU61
41	Police Bank^{OMB} including Border Bank and Heritage Isle	Sydney	1964	POIEAU21
42	Police Financial Services trading as BankVic	Melbourne	1974	POFVAU31
43	QPCU trading as QBANK	Brisbane	1964	QPUUAU41
44	Queensland Country Bank	Townsville	1971	QCCNAU41
45	Regional Australia Bank	Armidale	1969	CNMCAU21
46	Teachers Mutual Bank^{OMB} including Firefighters Mutual Bank, Health Professionals Bank and UniBank	Sydney	1966	TMUTAU21
47	Unity Bank^{OMB} including G&C Mutual Bank and Reliance Bank	Sydney	1970	MMPCAU21
48	Victoria Teachers trading as Bank First	Melbourne	1972	VITCAU31
Credit unions
No.	Firm name	Headquarters	Established	SWIFT-BIC
No.	Firm name	Notes		
49	Central Murray Credit Union trading as Central Murray Bank	Yarrawonga	1972	CUCNAU31
50	Central West Credit Union	Parkes	1966	CWCUAU21
51	Coastline Credit Union trading as Coastline Bank	Kempsey	1966	CTRIAU21
52	Community First Credit Union^{OMB} trading as Community First Bank, including Easy Street Financial Services and Illawarra Credit Union	Sydney	1959	CFCIAU21
53	Credit Union Australia trading as Great Southern Bank	Brisbane	1946	CUAUAU41
54	Credit Union SA	Adelaide	1958	CEUIAU51
55	Dnister Ukrainian Credit Co-operative	Melbourne	1951	DUCCAU31
56	Family First Credit Union trading as Family First Bank	Lithgow	1967	FFCUAU21
57	Fire Service Credit Union	Adelaide	1972	FSRUAU52
58	First Option Bank	Melbourne	1965	FOEUAU31
59	Ford Co-operative Credit Society trading as Geelong Bank	Geelong	1974	FCRSAU31
60	Goulburn Murray Credit Union Co-operative	Shepparton	1955	GMCUAU31
61	Horizon Credit Union trading as Horizon Bank	Wollongong	1964	HCRUAU21
62	Laboratories Credit Union	Sydney	1954	LCRNAU21
63	Macarthur Credit Union trading as The MAC	Camden	1971	MCCUAU21
64	Northern Inland Credit Union	Tamworth	1970	NICUAU21
65	Orange Credit Union trading as Bank Orange	Orange	1964	OCRNAU21
66	Police Credit Union	Adelaide	1970	PCRNAU51
67	Railways Credit Union trading as MOVE	Brisbane	1968	RARUAU41
68	South West Slopes Credit Union trading as SWSBANK	Young	1972	SWSRAU21
69	Southern Cross Credit Union	Kingscliff	1966	SCDUAU22
70	Summerland Financial Services trading as Summerland Bank	Lismore	1964	SURNAU21
71	The Broken Hill Community Credit Union trading as Broken Hill Bank	Broken Hill	1973	BHCCAU21
72	The Capricornian	Rockhampton	1959	CPNIAU41
73	Traditional Credit Union	Darwin	1994	TARUAU81
74	Transport Mutual Credit Union	Sydney	1964	
75	Warwick Credit Union trading as Darling Downs Bank	Warwick	1970	WCRUAU41
76	WAW Credit Union Co-Operative trading as BankWAW	Wodonga	1961	WCUCAU31
77	Woolworths Team Bank	Sydney	1971	WERUAU31
Other ADIs
No.	Firm name	Headquarters	Established	SWIFT-BIC
78	Cairns Penny Savings & Loans trading as Cairns Bank	Cairns	1899	

==== Restricted ADIs ====
As of 11 December 2025, there are currently no restricted authorised deposit-taking institutions regulated by APRA.

==== Local ADI rankings ====
Presented below is a ranking of ADIs based on CET1 capital accumulation within all local banking subsidiaries as of September 2025.

Local ADIs ranked by CET1 capital (as of September 2025)
Notes: Common Equity Tier 1 (CET1) capital, as defined under the Basel III framework, represents the highest quality and most loss-absorbing form of a bank’s capital, consisting mainly of common shares and retained earnings; unlike total assets, which indicate the size of a bank’s balance sheet, CET1 reflects its core financial strength and is widely regarded as the most reliable measure of a bank’s solvency and resilience under stress.
Rank	Bank	CET1 cap. (A$m)	CET1 ratio
1	Commonwealth Bank of Australia	58,933.1	11.8%
2	Westpac Banking Corporation	56,379.6	12.5%
3	Australia and New Zealand Banking Group	55,183.8	12.0%
4	National Australia Bank	51,526.6	11.7%
5	Macquarie Bank	19,123.3	12.4%
6	ING Bank (Australia)	4,994.1	15.1%
7	Bank of Queensland	4,391.2	10.9%
8	Bendigo and Adelaide Bank	4,261.7	10.9%
9	Norfina	3,638.0	10.8%
10	Rabobank Australia	3,449.7	14.6%
11	HSBC Bank Australia	2,686.6	12.1%
12	Newcastle Greater Mutual Group	1,849.9	23.5%
13	Judo Bank	1,551.4	12.7%
14	Heritage and People's Choice	1,350.8	15.3%
15	Credit Union Australia	1,184.6	15.2%
16	Bank Australia	1,075.5	15.6%
17	AMP Bank	975.0	10.8%
18	Teachers Mutual Bank	742.3	16.7%
19	Beyond Bank Australia	727.6	16.5%
20	Bank of China (Australia)	604.6	20.6%
21	MyState Bank	556.4	12.1%
22	IMB	487.1	13.1%
23	Police & Nurses	479.3	12.6%
24	Queensland Country Bank	348.5	20.9%
25	Unity Bank	322.3	17.6%
26	Bank of Sydney	317.9	18.7%
27	Regional Australia Bank	293.9	16.8%
28	Heartland Bank Australia	284.1	17.3%
29	Victoria Teachers	281.0	17.2%
30	Cuscal	260.6	27.5%
31	Defence Bank	258.1	14.8%
32	Police Financial Services	240.9	20.0%
33	Police Bank	227.9	21.2%
34	Australian Mutual Bank	215.2	28.7%
35	Members Banking Group	189.4	16.9%
36	Arab Bank Australia	165.6	22.9%
37	Community First Credit Union	165.5	16.0%
38	Tyro Payments	160.1	76.6%
39	Credit Union SA	122.8	15.0%
40	Gateway Bank	122.3	15.7%
41	Police Credit Union	121.9	16.5%
42	Hume Bank	113.5	14.4%
43	Australian Military Bank	110.2	13.3%
44	B & E	107.9	13.8%
45	BNK Banking Corporation	105.5	22.7%
46	QPCU	86.8	19.7%
47	Summerland Financial Services	82.8	19.2%
48	Railways Credit Union	71.1	18.3%
49	Maitland Mutual	70.7	14.9%
50	Southern Cross Credit Union	70.2	17.9%
51	Coastline Credit Union	65.6	16.9%
52	Goulburn Murray Credit Union Co-operative	62.1	26.2%
53	Horizon Credit Union	54.4	18.7%
54	Indue	46.7	17.4%
55	WAW Credit Union Co-Operative	46.1	17.4%
56	Northern Inland Credit Union	40.1	24.1%
57	Macarthur Credit Union	31.4	20.3%
58	Orange Credit Union	31.1	23.0%
59	Warwick Credit Union	31.0	13.4%
60	South West Slopes Credit Union	30.3	22.6%
61	The Capricornian	28.8	17.7%
62	Central West Credit Union	27.1	24.3%
63	Dnister Ukrainian Credit Co-operative	26.7	20.5%
64	Laboratories Credit Union	19.3	19.7%
65	Alex Bank	18.4	37.8%
66	First Option Bank	18.1	17.6%
67	Avenue Bank	17.6	115.4%
68	IN1Bank	16.3	240.1%
69	Family First Credit Union	16.0	17.5%
70	Ford Co-operative Credit Society	13.5	23.1%
71	The Broken Hill Community Credit Union	11.3	20.7%
72	Cairns Penny Savings & Loans	11.2	21.2%
73	Traditional Credit Union	10.9	180.9%
74	Woolworths Team Bank	9.6	18.1%
75	Australian Settlements	9.5	19.2%
76	Transport Mutual Credit Union	9.2	18.3%
77	Central Murray Credit Union	7.8	18.5%
78	Fire Service Credit Union	6.0	18.3%

=== Incorporated outside Australia ===
As of 11 December 2025, the Australian Prudential Regulation Authority (APRA) reported that 49 Authorized Deposit-taking Institutions (ADIs) are incorporated outside Australia. These entities generally operate as foreign branch banks and are subject to specific regulatory requirements under the Banking Act 1959.

Banks incorporated outside Australia
Notes: Bank: Special status. The bank is undergoing closure or acquisition/integration. For details, please refer to the Notes.
No.	Headquarters	Bank name	Established	SWIFT-BIC
No.	Headquarters	Bank name	Notes	
1	China	Agricultural Bank of China	2014	ABOCAU2S
2	United States	Bank of America	1964	BOFAAUSX
3	India	Bank of Baroda	2012	BARBAU2S
4	China	Bank of China	2008	BKCHAU2S
5	China	Bank of Communications	2011	COMMAU2S
6	Taiwan	Bank of Taiwan	2017	BKTWAUS2
7	United Kingdom	Barclays	2021	BARCAUSS
8	France	BNP Paribas	1986	BNPAAU2S
9	Canada	Canadian Imperial Bank of Commerce	2016	CIBCAU2S
10	China	China Construction Bank	2010	PCBCAU2S
11	China	China Everbright Bank	2018	EVERAU2S
12	China	China Merchants Bank	2017	CMBCAU2S
13	United States	Citibank.	1985	CITIAU2X
13	United States	Citibank.	Citibank N.A., Sydney Branch serves as the group foreign ADI in Australia, focusing on wholesale banking and operating in coordination with Citigroup Global Markets Australia. It is the third-largest provider of domestic asset custody services—as of June 30, 2025, the branch managed A$931.51 billion in Australian domestic assets under custody (AuC) and held A$23,028 million in total local resident assets.	
14	Netherlands	Rabobank	1996	RABOAUSS
15	France	Crédit Agricole Corporate and Investment Bank	2022	BSUIAU2S
16	Singapore	DBS Bank	2015	DBSSAU2S
17	Germany	Deutsche Bank	1994	DEUTAU2S
18	Taiwan	E.SUN Commercial Bank	2016	ESUNAUSS
19	Taiwan	First Commercial Bank	2009	FCBKAU4B
20	Taiwan	Hua Nan Commercial Bank	2011	HNBKAU2S
21	China	Industrial and Commercial Bank of China	1997	INGAAU2S
22	Netherlands	ING Bank	2008	ICBKAU2S
23	Italy	Intesa Sanpaolo	2020	BCITAU2S
24	United States	Chase Bank	2004	CHASAU2X
25	South Korea	Hana Financial Group	2013	KOEXAU2S
26	Taiwan	Land Bank of Taiwan	2025	LBOTAU4B
27	Taiwan	Mega International Commercial Bank	1997	ICBCAU2S
28	Japan	Mizuho Bank	2003	MHCBAU2S
29	Japan	MUFG Bank	2003	BOTKAU2X
30	South Korea	Nonghyup Bank	2022	NACFAU2S
31	Singapore	OCBC Bank	1996	OCBCAU2S
32	Canada	Royal Bank of Canada	1997	RBDOAUB1
33	South Korea	Shinhan Bank	2016	SHBKAU2S
34	France	Societe Generale	2019	SOGEAU21
35	United Kingdom	Standard Chartered	2001	SCBLAU2S
36	India	State Bank of India	2004	SBINAU2S
37	United States	State Street Bank & Trust Company	1986	SBOSAU2X
38	Japan	Sumitomo Mitsui Banking Corporation	2006	SMBCAU2S
39	Taiwan	Taishin International Bank	2017	TSIBAU44
40	Taiwan	Taiwan Business Bank	2002	MBBTAU2S
41	Taiwan	Taiwan Cooperative Bank	2011	TACBAU2S
42	United States	BNY	2009	BNYMAU2S
43	Canada	Scotiabank	2016	NOSCAU2S
44	Hong Kong	HSBC	1986	HSBCAU2S
44	Hong Kong	HSBC	The Hongkong and Shanghai Banking Corporation, Sydney Branch is a foreign ADI focusing on wholesale banking and is Australia largest provider of domestic asset custody services, managing over A$1.8 trillion in Australian domestic assets under custody (AuC) as of June 30, 2025—more than double the A$940 billion held by the second-largest provider, JPMorgan Chase Bank, N.A. Sydney Branch—while its own local resident assets totaled A$36,957.5 million, approximately half the scale of its retail-oriented affiliate, HSBC Bank Australia, with which it maintains partial operational overlaps.	
45	United States	Northern Trust	2008	CNORAU3M
46	Switzerland	UBS	1998	UBSWAU2S
47	India	Union Bank of India	2015	UBINAU2S
48	Singapore	United Overseas Bank	1986	UOVBAU2S
49	South Korea	Woori Bank	2012	HVBKAU2S

=== Total resident assets ===
The following table ranks banking entities and financial groups in Australia by total resident assets, based on statistics released by the Australian Prudential Regulation Authority (APRA) as of September 2025. While this dataset specifically focuses on assets held by Australian residents and excludes non-resident holdings, the figures remain a close proxy for the total balance sheet of each institution. This correlation is due to Australia status as a primarily domestic-focused market rather than a major offshore financial hub; consequently, for the vast majority of these banks, resident assets comprise the bulk of their global operations, although the "Big Four" banks also hold significant assets in New Zealand.

Ranking of ADIs by domestic resident assets as of September 2025
Notes: Market share figures are calculated as the weighted average of each institution's deposit and loan market shares (weighted at 50% each) within the retail and commercial banking sectors, providing a comprehensive measure of their overall market presence.
Rank	Bank name	Total resident assets (A$m)	Total resident deposits (A$m)	Customer accounts (A$m)		Loans to customers (A$m)		Market share (%)	
Rank	Bank name	Total resident assets (A$m)	Total resident deposits (A$m)	Retail	Commercial	Retail	Commercial	Retail	Commercial
1	Commonwealth Bank of Australia	1,179,885	792,443	442,169	218,457	626,765	222,942	25.96%	20.24%
2	Westpac Banking Corporation	1,100,364	627,122	343,848	194,153	508,329	192,378	20.61%	17.75%
3	National Australia Bank	972,889	560,784	229,754	215,499	359,194	255,763	14.17%	21.49%
4	ANZ Bank	859,249	467,094	229,356	155,102	395,239	164,267	14.89%	14.62%
	Australia and New Zealand Banking Group	759,314	411,196	190,674	142,459	336,140	150,586	12.53%	13.42%
	Norfina	99,935	55,898	38,682	12,643	59,099	13,681	2.36%	1.20%
5	Macquarie Bank	304,049	199,789	91,706	57,984	157,357	20,991	5.94%	3.75%
6	ING Bank	126,571	57,719	53,873	3,383	69,606	12,157	3.03%	0.68%
	ING Bank (Australia)	110,148	57,719	53,873	3,383	69,606	12,157	3.03%	0.68%
	ING Bank N.V. _{Sydney Branch}	16,423	-	-	-	-	-	-	-
7	Bank of Queensland	117,164	70,146	33,647	15,383	54,881	14,397	2.12%	1.37%
8	Bendigo and Adelaide Bank	113,521	75,055	49,393	19,756	65,637	14,834	2.81%	1.60%
9	HSBC Bank	103,808	38,262	18,127	15,864	34,978	20,546	1.25%	1.65%
	HSBC Bank Australia	66,858	38,091	18,127	15,820	34,978	2,794	1.25%	0.90%
	HSBC Bank _{Sydney Branch}	36,950	171	-	44	-	17,752	-	0.75%
10	Rabobank	51,652	18,568	8,160	5,838	218	30,386	0.25%	1.58%
	Rabobank Australia	28,288	17,854	8,160	5,829	218	23,103	0.25%	1.27%
	Rabobank _{Sydney Branch}	23,364	714	-	9	-	7,283	-	0.31%
11	Sumitomo Mitsui Banking Corporation Sydney Branch	44,125	14,048	-	8,575	-	26,177	-	1.53%
12	Bank of China	43,405	21,692	5,171	13,907	7,460	21,477	0.31%	1.60%
	Bank of China (Australia)	9,292	5,192	5,171	10	7,460	4	0.31%	-
	Bank of China _{Sydney Branch}	34,113	16,500	-	13,897	-	21,473	-	1.60%
13	Bank of America, N.A. Sydney Branch	35,169	7,786	-	6,883	-	3,422	-	0.49%
14	AMP Bank	33,066	13,194	9,416	2,704	22,829	587	0.74%	0.16%
15	MUFG Bank Sydney Branch	29,423	15,675	-	10,975	-	18,054	-	1.31%
16	Heritage and People's Choice	27,885	20,690	17,684	2,121	21,071	224	0.96%	0.11%
17	Newcastle Greater Mutual Group	26,244	19,152	16,954	1,488	18,496	118	0.88%	0.08%
18	Mizuho Bank Sydney Branch	25,569	6,786	-	6,253	-	15,911	-	0.98%
19	Credit Union Australia	24,161	15,602	13,446	720	18,028	163	0.77%	0.04%
20	UBS AG Sydney Branch	22,973	6,385	255	4,008	736	2,272	0.02%	0.29%
21	Citibank, N.A. Sydney Branch	22,407	17,862	-	8,375	-	5,320	-	0.64%
22	Bank Australia	21,838	14,532	12,557	1,357	14,394	416	0.67%	0.08%
23	BNP Paribas Sydney Branch	21,747	22,600	-	5,638	-	6,095	-	0.54%
24	United Overseas Bank Sydney Branch	21,032	1,746	-	202	-	10,741	-	0.47%
25	JPMorgan Chase Bank, N.A. Sydney Branch	20,951	15,412	-	4,154	-	1,323	-	0.26%
26	Judo Bank	18,862	10,511	6,086	2,338	1,163	11,617	0.21%	0.61%
27	Oversea-Chinese Banking Corporation Sydney Branch	18,733	904	-	190	-	14,431	-	0.62%
28	DBS Bank Sydney Branch	17,885	2,388	-	410	-	10,833	-	0.48%
29	Industrial and Commercial Bank of China Sydney Branch	17,536	3,841	36	2,037	-	11,475	-	0.59%
30	Deutsche Bank Aktiengesellschaft Sydney Branch	16,951	454	-	182	-	3,085	-	0.14%
31	Royal Bank of Canada Sydney Branch	15,575	3,516	-	-	-	2,022	-	0.09%
32	Beyond Bank Australia	14,948	8,594	6,916	1,479	9,276	331	0.40%	0.09%
33	Teachers Mutual Bank	13,125	9,424	8,776	189	9,630	1	0.46%	0.01%
34	China Construction Bank Corporation Sydney Branch	12,186	1,766	7	1,752	-	5,920	-	0.34%
35	Bank of Communications Sydney Branch	11,081	121	-	121	-	5,343	-	0.23%
36	Police & Nurses	10,741	7,778	6,286	952	7,375	487	0.34%	0.07%
37	IMB	10,503	7,016	5,631	1,004	6,704	441	0.30%	0.07%
38	Agricultural Bank of China Sydney Branch	9,284	54	-	-	-	3,455	-	0.15%
39	MyState Bank	9,138	6,490	5,275	800	6,470	20	0.29%	0.04%
40	Credit Agricole Corporate and Investment Bank Sydney Branch	8,249	140	-	140	-	6,965	-	0.30%
41	China Everbright Bank Sydney Branch	7,724	596	-	576	-	3,095	-	0.16%
42	State Street Bank and Trust Company Sydney Branch	7,223	10,518	-	-	-	-	-	-
43	Auswide Bank	6,240	3,897	2,523	946	4,318	280	0.16%	0.06%
44	Societe Generale Sydney Branch	6,072	-	-	-	-	5,367	-	0.23%
45	Defence Bank	4,936	3,348	2,814	411	3,741	-	0.16%	0.02%
46	Standard Chartered Bank Sydney Branch	4,891	2,467	-	1,826	-	1,893	-	0.17%
47	Victoria Teachers	4,614	3,310	3,049	149	3,184	1	0.16%	0.01%
48	Unity Bank	4,598	3,179	2,224	593	2,435	436	0.12%	0.05%
49	Regional Australia Bank	4,561	3,543	2,691	803	2,993	245	0.14%	0.05%
50	Canadian Imperial Bank of Commerce Sydney Branch	4,393	194	-	136	-	3,455	-	0.15%
51	Bank of Sydney	4,332	3,117	1,741	935	1,918	935	0.09%	0.09%
52	Queensland Country Bank	4,292	3,554	2,787	623	3,044	136	0.15%	0.04%
53	Police Financial Services	4,011	3,050	2,545	339	2,902	-	0.14%	0.02%
54	Mega International Commercial Bank Sydney Branch	3,996	257	12	243	10	2,760	-	0.13%
55	Members Banking Group	3,813	2,535	2,362	49	2,703	1	0.13%	-
56	E.SUN Commercial Bank Sydney Branch	3,806	149	28	121	-	2,824	-	0.13%
57	Cuscal	3,596	2,804	-	-	-	-	-	-
58	Community First Credit Union	3,595	2,076	1,828	171	1,924	26	0.09%	0.01%
59	The Northern Trust Company Sydney Branch	3,373	15,287	-	4,037	-	206	-	0.21%
60	Police Bank	3,360	2,257	2,036	166	2,266	1	0.11%	0.01%
61	Heartland Bank Australia	3,087	2,092	1,063	539	2,085	214	0.07%	0.04%
62	The Bank of Nova Scotia Sydney Branch	3,049	50	-	50	-	2,436	-	0.11%
63	First Commercial Bank Sydney Branch	2,999	491	7	484	-	2,280	-	0.12%
64	Intesa Sanpaolo SPA Sydney Branch	2,967	-	-	-	-	2,201	-	0.09%
65	B & E	2,775	1,680	1,292	274	1,671	35	0.07%	0.02%
66	Hume Bank	2,547	2,072	1,513	474	1,562	85	0.08%	0.03%
67	Australian Military Bank	2,547	1,733	1,012	390	1,832	-	0.07%	0.02%
68	Credit Union SA	2,404	1,837	1,647	125	1,712	77	0.08%	0.01%
69	Australian Mutual Bank	2,273	1,613	1,475	113	1,339	29	0.07%	0.01%
70	State Bank of India Sydney Branch	2,110	594	6	573	-	1,623	-	0.10%
71	Taiwan Business Bank Sydney Branch	2,067	93	6	86	34	1,690	-	0.08%
72	Wise Australia	2,044	1,843	1,503	340	-	-	0.05%	0.02%
73	Gateway Bank	1,995	1,284	992	35	1,447	15	0.06%	-
74	Australian Unity Bank	1,728	1,570	1,258	241	1,424	31	0.07%	0.01%
75	China Merchants Bank Sydney Branch	1,697	537	13	524	-	1,125	-	0.07%
76	PayPal Australia	1,688	783	174	585	-	-	0.01%	0.03%
77	Hua Nan Commercial Bank Sydney Branch	1,660	7	-	7	-	1,038	-	0.04%
78	Taishin International Bank Sydney Branch	1,599	154	1	154	-	1,230	-	0.06%
79	Police Credit Union	1,497	1,340	1,157	182	1,035	175	0.06%	0.02%
80	Arab Bank Australia	1,422	1,078	463	383	613	336	0.03%	0.03%
81	Maitland Mutual	1,418	1,020	610	310	842	148	0.04%	0.02%
82	Taiwan Cooperative Bank Sydney Branch	1,306	242	2	240	-	959	-	0.05%
83	QPCU	1,291	849	726	106	885	2	0.04%	0.01%
84	BNK Banking Corporation	1,223	987	527	448	721	137	0.03%	0.03%
85	Summerland Financial Services	1,199	1,083	833	223	895	34	0.04%	0.01%
86	Shinhan Bank Sydney Branch	1,174	141	-	141	-	500	-	0.03%
87	Railways Credit Union	1,049	881	714	131	788	-	0.04%	0.01%
88	KEB HANA Bank Sydney Branch	1,017	131	-	113	5	857	-	0.04%
89	Southern Cross Credit Union	997	909	703	128	796	46	0.04%	0.01%
90	Bank of Baroda Sydney Branch	985	436	5	4	-	805	-	0.03%
91	Bank of Taiwan Sydney Branch	958	22	-	22	-	460	-	0.02%
92	Coastline Credit Union	955	863	724	64	661	92	0.04%	0.01%
93	Barclays Bank Sydney Branch	861	495	-	445	-	788	-	0.06%
94	Indue	779	688	-	221	-	2	-	0.01%
95	Horizon Credit Union	768	696	628	68	515	29	0.03%	-
96	WAW Credit Union Co-Operative	730	673	541	102	488	56	0.03%	0.01%
97	Woori Bank Sydney Branch	725	65	-	65	-	524	-	0.03%
98	Australian Settlements	610	591	-	250	-	-	-	0.01%
99	Goulburn Murray Credit Union Co-operative	598	525	433	82	368	39	0.02%	0.01%
100	Warwick Credit Union	540	494	345	141	382	70	0.02%	0.01%
101	Union Bank of India Sydney Branch	520	41	-	-	-	315	-	0.01%
102	Tyro Payments	458	102	-	102	-	58	-	0.01%
103	Northern Inland Credit Union	456	408	349	60	329	10	0.02%	-
104	The Capricornian	440	402	359	42	350	14	0.02%	-
105	Macarthur Credit Union	389	351	313	39	267	13	0.01%	-
106	Orange Credit Union	323	288	268	17	216	2	0.01%	-
107	South West Slopes Credit Union	323	283	247	36	188	5	0.01%	-
108	Laboratories Credit Union	308	284	247	23	246	1	0.01%	-
109	Nonghyup Bank Sydney Branch	306	35	-	35	-	175	-	0.01%
110	First Option Bank	306	276	254	18	237	1	0.01%	-
111	Central West Credit Union	296	264	230	34	152	8	0.01%	-
112	Dnister Ukrainian Credit Co-operative	288	256	242	-	206	10	0.01%	-
113	Family First Credit Union	262	232	222	10	215	-	0.01%	-
114	Land Bank of Taiwan Sydney Branch	165	2	-	2	-	92	-	-
115	Alex Bank	59	38	32	-	45	-	-	-
116	The Bank of New York Mellon Sydney Branch	54	-	-	-	-	-	-	-
117	Avenue Bank	50	31	-	31	-	-	-	-
118	IN1Bank	27	9	5	3	3	-	-	-

== See also ==
- Banking in Australia
- List of banks
- List of banks in Oceania
