= HSBC Bank Australia =

Australian subsidiary of multinational bank

HSBC Bank Australia Limited

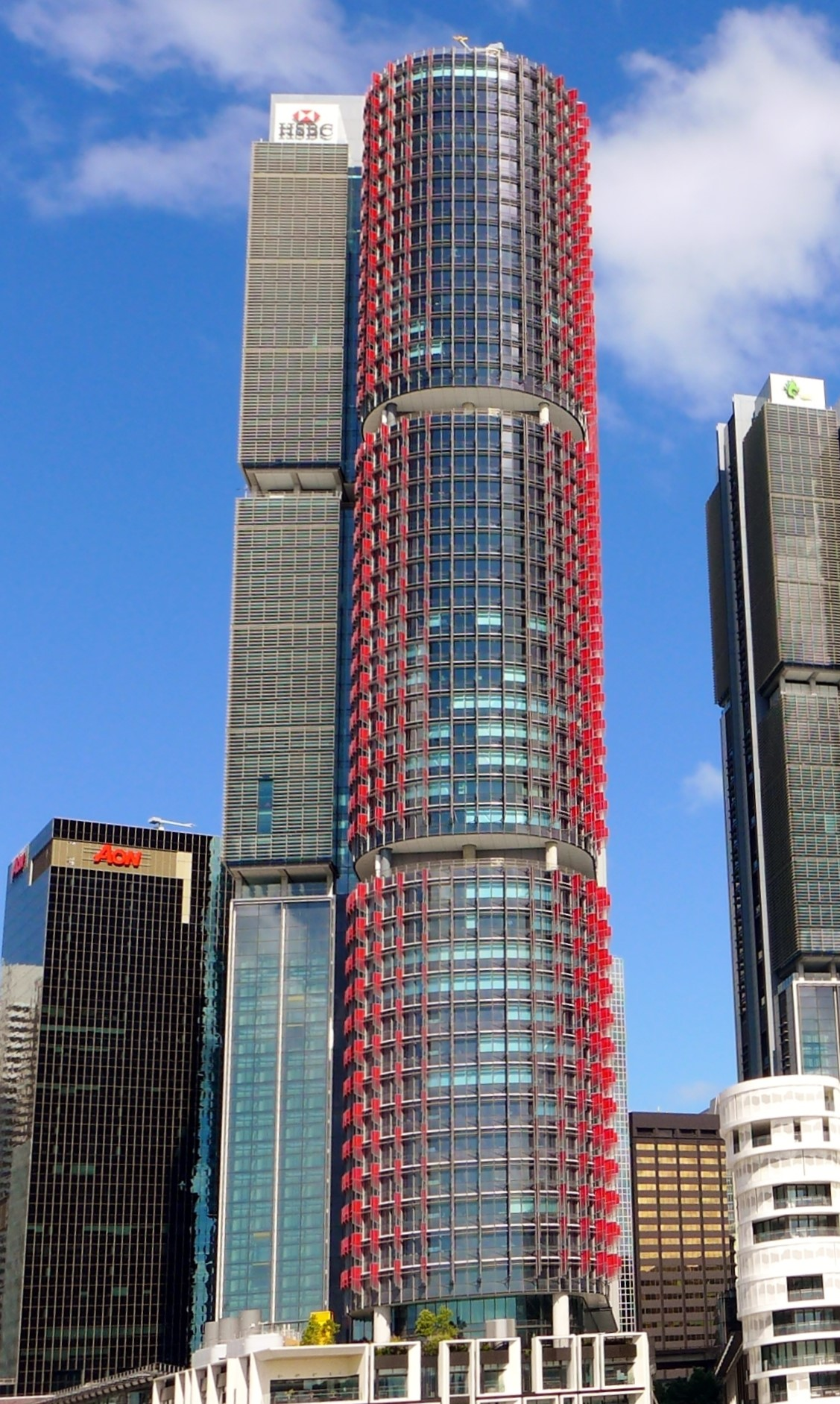
- Headquarters at Tower 1, International Towers, Barangaroo, Sydney
- Type: Subsidiary
- Industry: Banking
- Founded: 1985; 41 years ago
- Headquarters: Sydney, Australia
- Key people: Antony Shaw (CEO)
- Products: Financial services, consumer banking, investment banking, wealth management, mortgages, personal loans, credit cards
- Number of employees: 2,000
- Parent: HSBC Holdings plc
- Website: www.hsbc.com.au

HSBC Bank Australia Limited (formerly the Hongkong Bank of Australia Limited) is the Australian subsidiary of HSBC. The bank offers a wide range of financial services in Australia through a network of 36 branches and offices. These services include retail and commercial banking, financial planning, trade finance, treasury, and financial markets, payments and cash management, and securities custody.

HSBC Bank Australia was granted a banking licence in 1986, although the bank had originally established an Australian presence as Hongkong Finance Ltd in 1964. It is a foreign bank in Australia, offering a wide range of banking products and services to the retail, commercial, corporate and institutional sectors.

The bank's headquarters is located in Barangaroo, a suburb in central Sydney.

== History ==
HSBC was granted an Australian banking licence in 1986 after the Australian federal government changed the rules to allow foreign banks into the country. HSBC was one of the first foreign banks to enter Australia, the first being Chase-AMP.

In 1986, HSBC Australia launched its Commercial Financial Services offering, followed by Personal Financial Services in 1991. It achieved profitability in 1992.

In 1995, it introduced discount home loans in Australia, and 1997 saw the introduction of telephone banking and credit cards. HSBC InvestDirect (Australia) Limited was established in 1998.

In 2001, HSBC Australia acquired NRMA Building Society Limited, and launched Internet banking for personal customers.

Further deals followed in 2005, when the bank's Australian asset management business was sold to Challenger Financial Service, and 2006, with the sales of its broker-originated mortgage book to Firstmac; margin lending portfolio to St. George; and online stockbroking business to E-Trade. HSBC Australia, as well as the acquisition of the Westpac sub-custody business in Australia and New Zealand. A global investment arm launched in 2008.

HSBC branch, Booragoon, 2026

By January 2025, HSBC was studying options to restructure its Australian business including a sale of its consumer banking business, while keeping the commercial banking operation.

In July 2026, HSBC announced that they would close their Australian branches within 18 months. HSBC's mortgage and personal loan portfolio will be sold to Blackstone pending regulatory approval. HSBC's other retail products will be discontinued.

== Products and services ==
=== Bank accounts ===
HSBC offers a wide range of bank accounts in Australia, including transaction and savings accounts, term deposits, and foreign currency accounts.

HSBC Premier, which is available in Australia and other markets within the HSBC Group, is a premium banking service that is available for its wealthy clients and includes a personal financial planning service, an online share trading platform, and SMSF assistance to advise upon all types of personal and business investments.

=== Credit cards ===
HSBC credit cards include low-rate, low-fee, and rewards cards, with features including low-interest rates and annual fees, balance transfer offers, and an ability to earn HSBC Rewards points which can be redeemed for a range of products and services, or Qantas Points towards the Qantas Frequent Flyer program.

=== Home loans ===
HSBC home loans feature flexible repayment plans, a personal relationship manager, and the ability to easily switch a home loan from another bank.

=== Personal loans ===
HSBC personal loans provide the ability to borrow money when needed for a range of situations. Applications can be completed online, with quick approval and transfer of funds, along with fixed repayments. HSBC's loans were rated an expert's choice by Mozo for Overall Value.

=== Insurance ===
HSBC Insurance products include general home and contents or landlord insurance, car insurance, life insurance including critical illness cover and life cover, as well as travel insurance, issued by Allianz Australia Life Insurance Limited.

== See also ==
- Banking in Australia
- List of banks
- List of banks in Australia
- List of banks in Oceania
- Reserve Bank of Australia
- Australian Prudential Regulation Authority
- Australian Securities and Investments Commission
