= ING Australia =

Australian bank

ING Bank (Australia) Limited
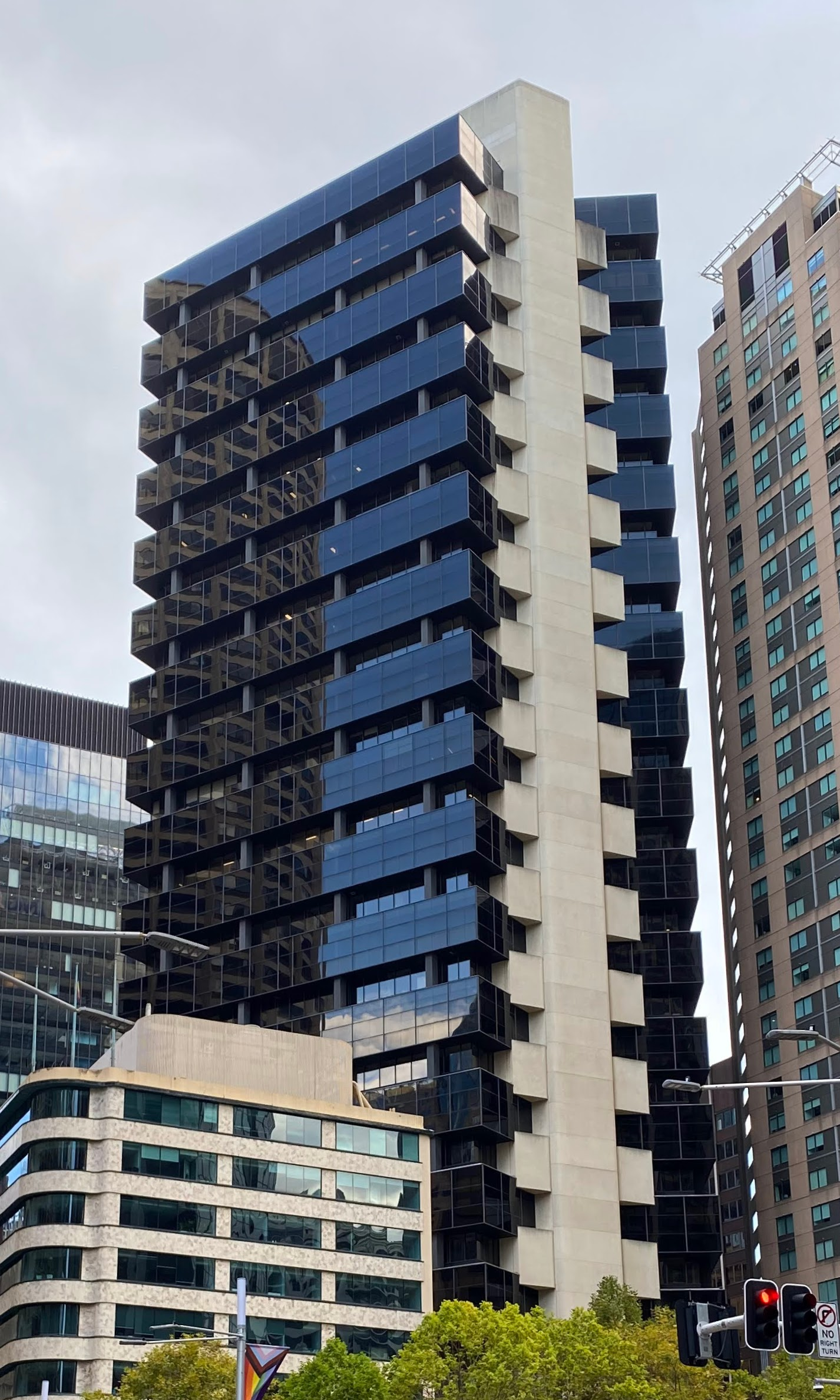
- Headquarters at 60 Margaret Street (Met Centre), Sydney
- Type: Subsidiary
- Industry: Banking, financial services
- Founded: 1999
- Headquarters: 60 Margaret Street, Sydney, Australia
- Area served: Australia
- Key people: Melanie Evans, CEO
- Products: Finance and insurance Consumer banking Corporate banking Superannuation; Mortgages
- Revenue: ▲ A$1.69 billion (2023)
- Net income: ▲ A$654 million (2023)
- Total assets: ▲ A$87.0 billion (2023)
- Total equity: ▼ A$6.0 billion (2023)
- Number of employees: 2,486 (December 2023)
- Parent: ING Group
- Divisions: Retail banking, business banking, wholesale banking
- Website: www.ing.com.au

ING Bank (Australia) Limited (trading as ING since 2017, and as ING DIRECT 1999–2017) is a direct bank operating in Australia. It is a wholly owned subsidiary of the multinational Dutch bank, ING Group. ING in Australia holds an Australian banking licence as a foreign subsidiary company.

ING operates through a number of controlled entities: trusts and the primary bank division, ING, which operates under the segments of Mortgages, Savings, Everyday Banking, Consumer Lending, Superannuation, Insurance, Wholesale Banking and Commercial Lending.

Founded in 1999, ING in Australia was Australia's first direct bank. It has since grown to become the largest mortgage lender outside of Australia's Big Four banks. ING scores favourably with customer satisfaction and has the highest net promoter score of any major financial institution in Australia.

As of December 2023, the bank had over 2.8 million customers. In December 2015, ING had a mortgage portfolio valued at AU$38.6 billion and AU$1.6 billion super funds under management, with 34,000 active superannuation retirement accounts in 2014.

As of December 2020, ING had a loan portfolio of $65.2b and deposits of $46.6b. Total customers had grown to 2.8m.

== History ==
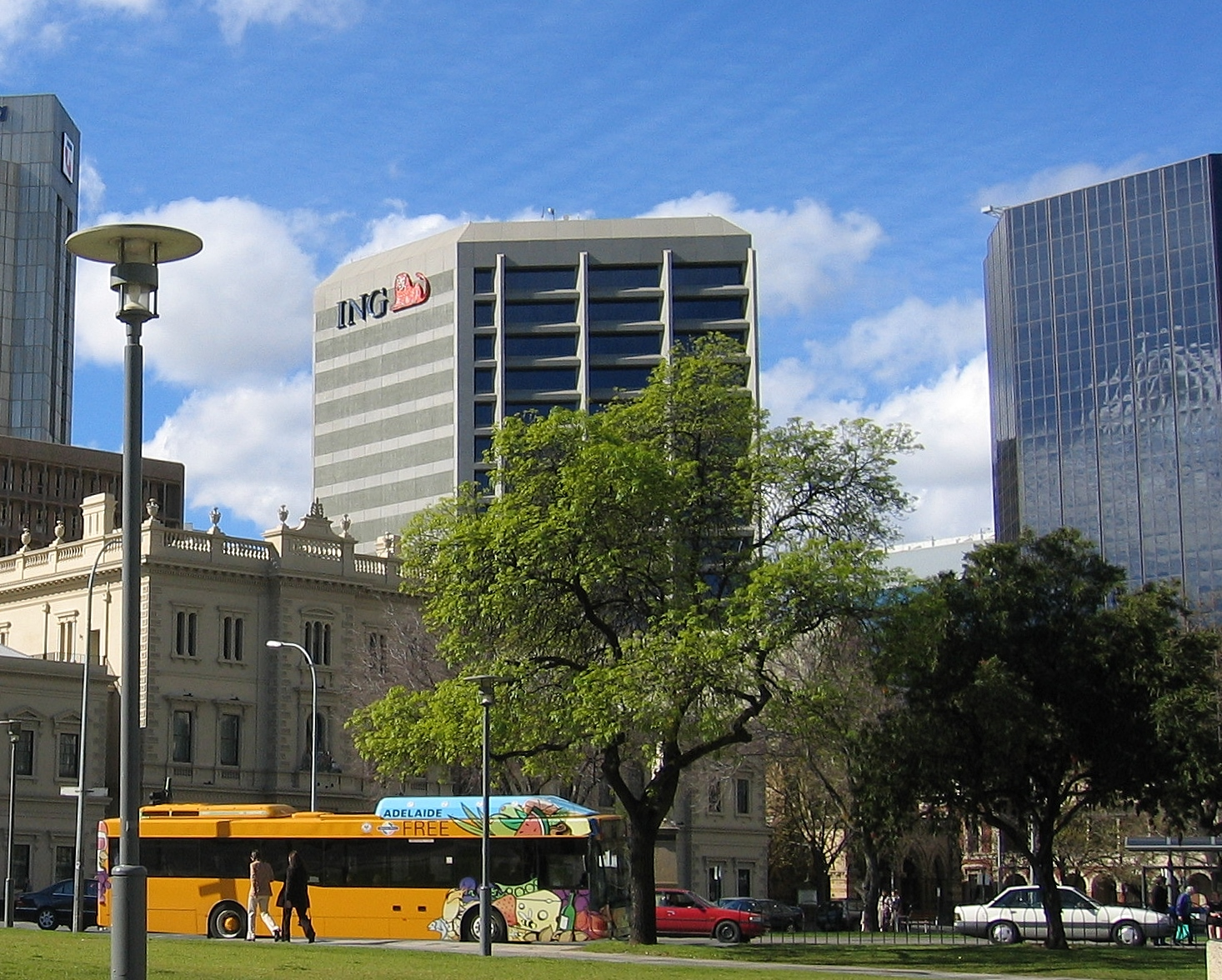
ING Direct office in Adelaide, 2004

Vaughn Richtor was the founding chief executive officer of ING DIRECT Australia in 1999, having joined ING Group in 1992. Richtor left Australia in 2005 to head ING Group's Indian operations, ING Vysya Bank before overseeing commercial and retail management in Asia from 2009. Erik Drok served as CEO from 2005 to 2009, followed by Don Koch until 2012. Vaughn Richtor returned as CEO 2012 while remaining to oversee management in Asia for ING Group.

In September 2009, the bank sold OnePath, its AU$1.86 billion insurance and wealth management stake it had shared with the ANZ Bank in a joint venture since 2002 (51% ING Group ownership; 49% ANZ ownership), making ANZ the sole owner. The divestment of ING Insurance Australia followed similar measures globally as part of ING Group's structural changes as a result of the 2008 financial crisis. In 2010, ING Insurance was subsequently rebranded as OnePath.

Announced in March 2012, the bank completed an upgrade of IT infrastructure in 2014. The "Zero Touch" project involved moving the bank's entire operations into a private cloud, claimed to be the first for any bank in Australia. Dubbed 'Bank in a box', virtualization of the entire banking platform allows for simultaneous copies of the banking platform to exist on the company's servers. This provides greater flexibility and efficiency for developing new products and services, and the new virtualization technology will also improve redundancy measures and customer experience.

In September 2012, the bank entered the superannuation market with Living Super, a self-managed superannuation fund (SMSF).

Uday Sareen replaced Vaughn Richtor as CEO in June 2016 after Richtor announced his plans to retire from business.

In August 2017, the bank announced it was changing its brand name from ING DIRECT to simply ING.

In November 2020, Melanie Evans became CEO, the first female and Australian to lead the Australian subsidiary of ING. Prior to being appointed CEO, Melanie Evans led the Retail Banking unit having joined ING in March 2017.

== Headquarters and physical locations ==
The bank launched as ING Direct in August 1999 and operated out of the offices of its sister company ING Australia at 347 Kent Street, Sydney and then North Sydney.

In March 2001 the bank signed a lease on several floors of the 14-storey office building at 140 Sussex Street, Sydney; subsequent growth led to the bank taking on additional floors over the next five years, culminating in ING leasing the entire building from 2007.

By the end of 2001, ING had a physical (non-branch) customer-facing presence, via its 'Customer Information Centres' (CICs), at 347 Kent Street, Sydney, 140 Queen Street, Melbourne (until August 2007), 100 Edward Street, Brisbane (until November 2010) and at 45 Pirie Street, Adelaide and 158 St Georges Terrace, Perth (both until late 2002). The Sydney CIC was relocated to the bank's headquarters at 140 Sussex Street in 2007.

In July 2002 a second office was opened in Tuggerah, approximately 100 km north of Sydney on the Central Coast of New South Wales; the building was shared with ING Australia. This office serves primarily as a Contact Centre, while also providing some limited administrative functions.

In February 2017 ING's headquarters, along with 1,000+ staff members, were relocated to 60 Margaret Street Sydney, where the bank signed a lease over seven floors of the 36-storey tower.

== Retail banking ==
ING offers a variety of banking accounts and financial services to Australian residents. Operating as a direct bank, ING has no ATM network or branches of its own. Services and support are provided over the phone or through online banking. No-fee access to any Australian ATM is provided through a loyalty program.

=== Products ===
- Business savings and commercial mortgage accounts;
- Retail and Self-Managed Superannuation Funds (SMSFs) with life insurance;
- Savings and time deposit accounts;
- Transaction accounts;
- Variable and fixed-rate mortgage loans;
- General insurance; home and contents, car, travel and pet insurance;
- Personal loans;
- Credits cards;
- Wholesale Banking.

=== Government guarantee ===
The Australian government's Financial Claims Scheme guarantees deposits up to AU$250,000 per depositor per authorised deposit-taking institution (ADI). Deposits with ING are covered by the guarantee. ING operates in Australia as a foreign subsidiary with an Australian banking licence.

In 2008, AU$1.5 billion of deposits flowed out from ING, amid consumer uncertainty as to whether the Australian government's deposit guarantee scheme set up during the 2008 financial crisis applied to foreign-owned banks. Despite the outflow, deposits soon stabilized with ING achieving a net income of AU$182 million for 2008, up from 2007.

=== Orange Everyday ===
ATMs are free to use throughout Australia and overseas where they pay no ING international transaction fees, as long as they deposit $1,000 or more each month and from March 2018 and make five or more card purchases.

== See also ==
- Banking in Australia
- List of banks
- List of banks in Australia
- List of banks in Oceania
