= Trov =

Trōv
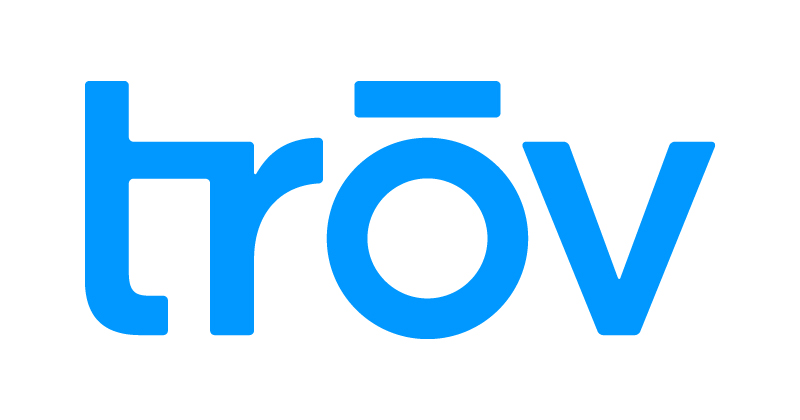
- Founded: 2012
- Founders: Scott Walchek, Mark Dowds & Jim Gemmell
- Headquarters: San Francisco, California
- Services: Mobile applications

Trov, stylized as Trōv, is an American technology company based in the San Francisco Bay Area. CEO Scott Walchek, founded Trōv in 2012.

== Overview ==
Current customers include Suncorp, Lloyds Banking Group, Waymo, PSA, and Zerology.

Trōv pivoted to a business-to-business model and shut down its direct-to-consumer mobile insurance platform in 2019. Previously, the company offered this platform to consumers in Australia, the United States and the United Kingdom.

Trōv's consumer app offered insurance for individual items that could be toggled on and off using "micro-duration policies". The application allowed users to track their possessions using a photograph or an item or receipt and was backed up to the cloud. Trōv partnered with insurance carriers based on geographic region to offer coverage for consumer's belongings protected through the app.

In 2016, Trōv's Series C funding round generated $25.5 million led by Oak HC/FT. Suncorp Group, Guidewire, and previous investor Anthemis Group also participated in the funding round. As of 2016, Trōv has raised $39.2 million in total funding. The original cloud-based application was limited to personal inventory and tracking the value of possessions. Following the funding round, Trōv launched its mobile insurance platform in Australia in May 2016 through a partnership with Suncorp Group. Trōv partnered with AXA for coverage in the UK. In September 2016, Trōv reached an agreement with Munich Re to expand its insurance coverage in the U.S.

On April 7, 2017, Trōv closed a $45 million Series D funding round led by HSB Ventures, with participation from Oak HC/FT, Suncorp Group, Guidewire, Anthemis, and Japanese insurance giant Sompo Holdings. In 2019, Trov secured further funding from Sompo bringing total funding to just over $114 million.

As of February 23, 2022, Trōv has been acquired by Travelers Insurance group and has ceased to operate under its own brand.
