= Bank First =

Banks of Australia

- Industry: Banking
- Founded: 1972
- Headquarters: Hawthorn East, Victoria
- Area served: Australia
- Key people: Michelle Bagnall, (CEO); Simon Terry, (Chair)
- Products: Retail Banking; School & Preschool Banking; Insurance; Wealth Management
- Total assets: ▲ A$3.82 billion (2025)
- Number of employees: 241
- Website: Bank First

Bank First, formerly known as Victoria Teachers Mutual Bank, is an Australian financial institution based in the state of Victoria.

As a mutual bank, Bank First is owned by its customers and not external shareholders. Each of its over 90,000 customers owns an equal share of the organisation.

Established on 21 September 1972 as VTU Credit Union by 48 members of the Victorian Teachers Union, VTU Credit Union began operating from the basement of the VTU at 20 Bank Place, Melbourne.

Following the merger of state school teaching unions into the Victorian Branch of the Australian Education Union (AEU) VTU Credit Union rebadged to the Victorian Teachers Credit Union (VTCU), in 2012 VTCU changes its name to the Victorian Teachers Mutual Bank and moves to its new headoffice location at 117 Camberwell Road, Hawthorn East.

The bank was renamed Victoria Teachers Limited trading as Bank First, in December 2017.

== See also ==
- Banking in Australia
- List of banks
- List of banks in Australia
- List of banks in Oceania
