= Suncorp Group =

Australian financial company

Suncorp Group Limited

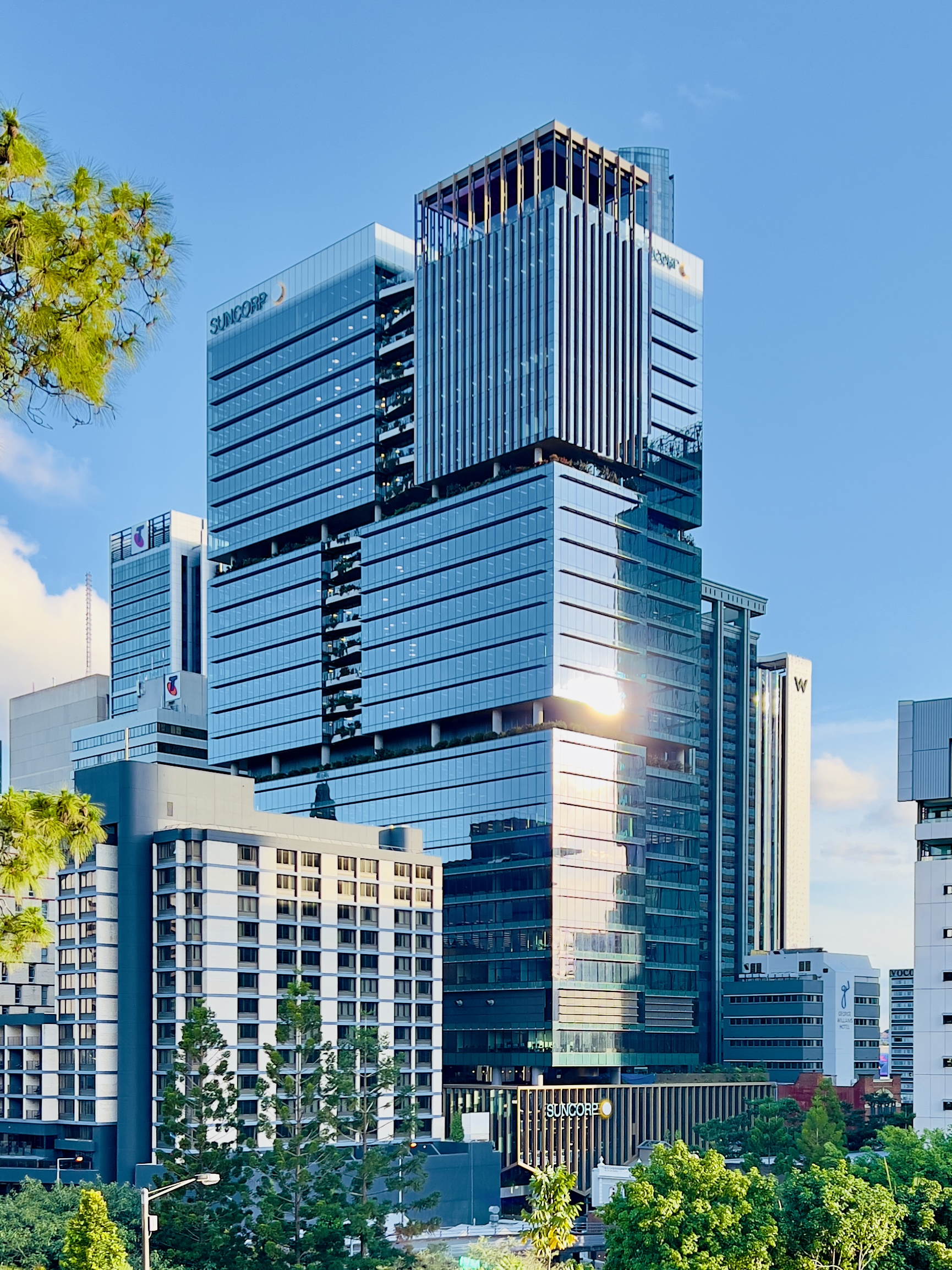
- Headquarters at 80 Ann Street, Brisbane
- Type: Public
- Traded as: ASX: SUN; S&P/ASX 200 component
- Industry: General insurance
- Founded: 1996; 30 years ago
- Headquarters: Brisbane, Queensland, Australia
- Area served: Australia and New Zealand
- Key people: Christine McLoughlin (chairman); Steve Johnston (CEO)
- Brands: Suncorp Insurance, AAMI, GIO, Bingle, Apia, Shannons, CIL, Vero, Terri Sheer, AA Insurance, Asteron Life, Essentials by AAI
- Revenue: ▲ A$14.99 billion (2022)
- Operating income: ▲ A$837 million (2022)
- Net income: ▲ A$ 631 million (2022)
- Total assets: ▲ A$106 billion (2022) (2022)
- Total equity: A$12.783 billion (2022)
- Number of employees: ~14,500 (2015)
- Subsidiaries: Suncorp Insurance; GIO; AAMI; Apia; Vero; Shannons; Bingle; Terri Scheer; Asteron Life
- Website: suncorpgroup.com.au

Suncorp Group Limited, known simply as Suncorp, is an Australian general insurance corporation based in Brisbane, Queensland, Australia. It was formed on 1 December 1996 by the merger of Suncorp, Metway Bank and the Queensland Industry Development Corporation (QIDC), and was one of Australia's mid-sized banks until 2022 (by combined lending and deposits), and its largest general insurance group.

== History ==
=== Queensland Industry Development Corporation ===
QIDC had its origins in Agbank, which was a state government farming financier inaugurated in 1902. In 1986, new Queensland legislation incorporated and regulated the bank as the Queensland Industry Development Corporation. By the mid 1990s, QIDC had assets of approximately $3 billion.

=== 1996 to 1999: Merger as Suncorp-Metway ===
Logo used 1998–2016

In response to sweeping changes in Australia's financial and insurance industries in the mid-1990s, and especially the increasing convergence of the banking and insurance sectors, the state owned QIDC and Suncorp were amalgamated with Metway Bank in 1996.

=== 2000s: Promina acquisition ===
During a retail banking review in 2007, Suncorp determined that its credit card portfolio was a non-core asset and entered into talks to sell its 100,000 card/$230 million credit-card portfolio to Citibank. Citibank now handles the operational aspects of credit whilst the Suncorp brand remains on the cards and Suncorp continues to provide customer interaction.

Suncorp then began preparations for a still larger takeover of insurance giant Promina Group. By early 2007, the two companies had agreed the terms of a merger deal valued at AUD 7.9 billion ($5.9 billion), which represented one of the largest acquisition deals completed in Australia's financial sector since the beginning of the new century. Promina was formerly part of the UK-based insurance giant Royal and Sun Alliance until it spun off the business in Australia as a separate public company in 2003.

As of 2007, Suncorp had assets of over A$95 billion, over 9 million customers, and over 16,000 staff. Suncorp operated 232 retail and business banking outlets, predominantly in Queensland. GIO operated 34 agencies in NSW and Victoria. An additional 157 retail branches and services centres were added with the Promina acquisition.

=== 2010s ===
In June 2013, Goldman Sachs's Special Situations Group, the proprietary investment unit of the investment bank, purchased some of Suncorp Group Ltd.'s loans for about US$863 million. In the summer of 2013 as European lenders were divesting their loans portfolios, in Australia, hedge funds and investment banks were buying them. In 2013, distressed-debt investors, seeking investment opportunities in Asia, particularly in Australia, acquired discounted bonds or bank loans of companies facing distressed debt, with the potential of profitable returns if the companies' performance or their debt-linked assets improves. In 2013 Australia was one of the biggest markets for distressed-debt investors in Asia.

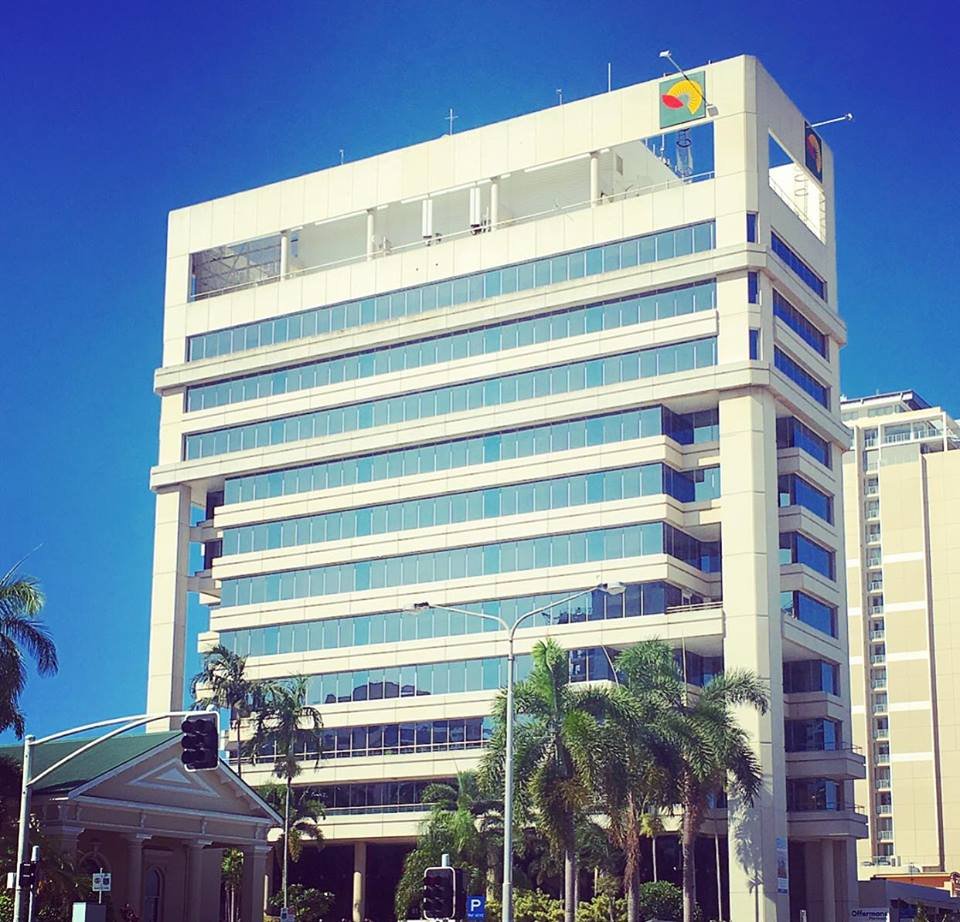
The Suncorp Business Centre in Townsville, 2019

Suncorp was granted a MySuper authority, enabling it to continue to receive default superannuation contribution from 1 January 2014. Suncorp Business Services appointed its new CEO, Matt Pancino, on 13 June 2014. Pancino formerly worked as the Chief Information Officer for the group. Suncorp was inducted into the Queensland Business Leaders Hall of Fame in 2016.

=== 2020s: Sale of banking arm ===
In 2020, Suncorp admitted to wage theft dating back to 2014. In June 2023, it was announced that remediation of the theft amounted a total $32 million in wages, misappropriated from 15,800 staff.

On 18 July 2022, Suncorp Group announced an agreement to sell Suncorp Bank to the Australia and New Zealand Banking Group (ANZ). The transaction was completed on 31 July 2024 after approval by the Australian Competition Tribunal on 20 February 2024 and the Federal Treasurer under the Financial Sector (Shareholdings) Act on 28 June 2024. The sale also required amendments to the Metway Merger Act, passed by the Queensland Parliament on 14 June 2024. Suncorp Group's rationale for the sale was to focus on becoming the leading trans-Tasman insurer by FY27.

== Business interests ==
Suncorp covers nearly all areas in wealth and banking, including life insurance, general insurance, commercial insurance, Compulsory Third Party (CTP), banking, finance, superannuation agricultural banking and business banking, the notable exception being health insurance. It is the largest banking and insurance corporation headquartered in Brisbane.

Suncorp trades under a number of brands, including AAMI, Apia, Shannons, InsureMyRide, Vero, Terri Scheer, Bingle, CIL and Tyndall insurance brands in Australia, and Vero, Asteron, Guardian Trust, Tyndall, Vero Liability, AA Insurance, SIS, CMV/AXIOM and Autosure brands in New Zealand. Those assets were acquired with the Promina Group in 2007. Tal Australia purchased Asteron Australia from Suncorp in December 2018.

=== Suncorp Bank ===
On 19 April 2009, Suncorp announced a re-branding of the banking arm of the company to Suncorp Bank, to emphasise that Suncorp was a bank with an insurance arm, not an insurance company with a banking division. In July 2022, Suncorp Group agreed terms to sell Suncorp Bank to the ANZ Bank for A$5 billion.

=== Joint ventures ===
Suncorp acquired insurance joint ventures with motoring clubs RACQ and RAA in 2001, but chose to divest them in 2010. Suncorp entered into a joint venture agreement with RACT Insurance in Tasmania in 2007, but sold its 50% interest back to RACT in July 2021.

== See also ==
- Banking in Australia
- List of banks
- List of banks in Australia
- List of banks in Oceania
