= VTU (disambiguation) =

VTU stands for Visvesvaraya Technological University, in Karnataka State, India.

VTU may also refer to:

- Veliko Tarnovo University, Bulgaria
- Vilnius Gediminas Technical University, formerly Vilnius Technical University
- Hermanos Ameijeiras Airport, Cuba, IATA code VTU
- Turpial Airlines, Venezuela, ICAO airline designator VTU
- Video teleconferencing unit
- Vertu Motors, stock ticker VTU
- Volunteer Training Units of the United States Navy Reserve
- Victoria Teachers Mutual Bank, Australia, formerly VTU Credit Union
