= AAMI =

Australian general insurance provider

Australian Associated Motor Insurers Limited
- Company type: Subsidiary
- Industry: Insurance
- Founded: 1970; 56 years ago
- Headquarters: Melbourne
- Area served: Australia
- Key people: Steve Johnston (CEO)
- Products: Vehicle insurance (Car, Motorcycle, Caravan, NSW and ACT CTP); Home insurance Travel insurance Business insurance Life insurance
- Parent: Suncorp Group
- Website: www.aami.com.au

Australian Associated Motor Insurers Limited (commonly referred to as AAMI) is an Australian general insurance provider offering car, home, CTP and business insurance. AAMI has vehicle assessment centres in Victoria, New South Wales, Queensland, South Australia and Western Australia. AAMI has been a brand and subsidiary of Suncorp Group since 2007. Its headquarters are in Melbourne, Victoria.

== History ==
Australian Associated Motor Insurers Ltd (AAMI) was founded with its current name in December 1970, after having provided insurance policies to motor clubs under an arrangement with Club Motor from 1934 onwards. AAMI commenced business as a motor vehicle insurer, offering an independent alternative to government-owned and motor club-owned insurers.

In 1989, AAMI diversified and launched into the home insurance market. Since then, AAMI has launched into a range of other areas, including travel, life insurance and small business insurance and income protection.

== Community initiatives ==
AAMI has launched a few community initiatives, such as the AAMI Skilled Drivers Course, and has partnerships with several public services such as Victoria State Emergency Service.
