= Suncorp Bank =

Agricultural Bank located in Queensland

Norfina Limited
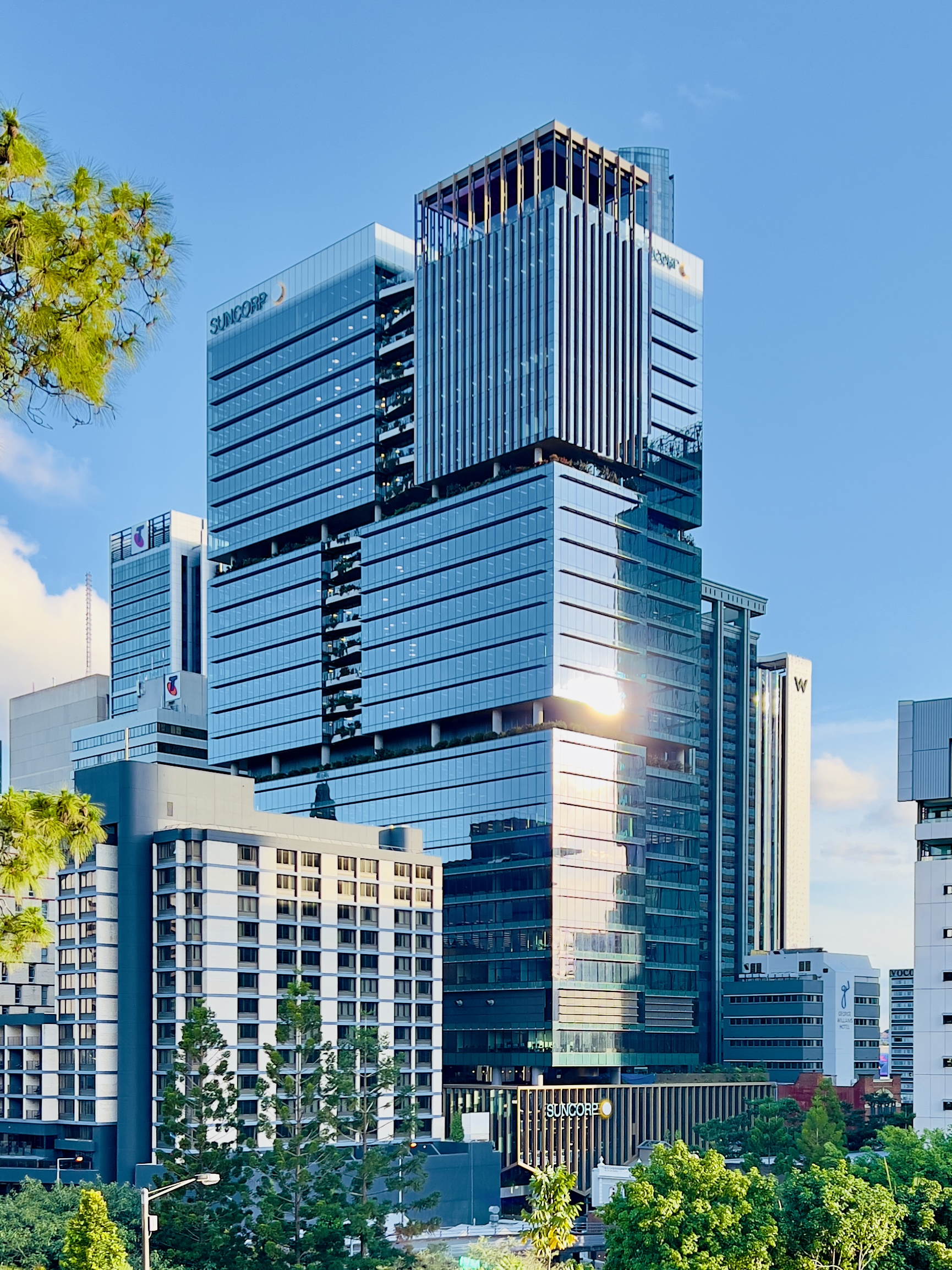
- Headquarters at 80 Ann Street, Brisbane
- Trade name: Suncorp Bank
- Formerly: Metropolitan Permanent Building Society; Metway Bank (1959–1996)
- Type: Subsidiary
- Traded as: SUNCORP-METWAY LIMITED (ABN 66 010 831 722)
- Industry: Banking and financial services
- Founded: 1902; 124 years ago
- Headquarters: 80 Ann Street, Brisbane, Queensland, Australia
- Key people: Mal Stedman (CEO)
- Products: Consumer Banking, including home loans (mortgages), credit cards, bank accounts, savings accounts and Business Banking, including business loans and business bank accounts
- Owner: ANZ Group (since 2024); Suncorp Group (until 2024)
- Parent: SBGH Ltd
- Website: suncorpbank.com.au

Norfina Limited (formerly Suncorp-Metway Limited) has licensed the Suncorp brand and Sun Logo from Suncorp Group and continues to trade and operate as Suncorp Bank after its acquisition by ANZ Group in 2022. From its beginnings in 1902 as the Queensland Agricultural Bank, Suncorp Bank has grown into the sixth largest now bank owned-bank in Australia, with head offices in Brisbane, Australia.

== History ==
The information in this section relates specifically to Suncorp Bank. For information relating to the group as a whole, see the history of the Suncorp Group.

=== State Government Insurance Office ===
Suncorp Bank commenced business in 1916 as the State Accident Insurance Office. Not long after, it changed its name to State Government Insurance Office (SGIO) and extended its operations into life insurance, general insurance and Compulsory Third Party. Over the years, superannuation, building society, and finance operations were added.

=== Queensland Industry Development Corporation (QIDC) ===
QIDC commenced operations in 1986, but evolved from the Queensland Agricultural Bank established in 1902. Initially operating primarily as a rural financier, QIDC expanded its activities to include commercial lending to small and medium-sized businesses.

=== Suncorp–Metway merger ===
On 1 December 1996, the Queensland Government owned Suncorp and QIDC entities were merged with the publicly listed company Metway Bank to create the new allfinanz group Suncorp Metway. At the time of the merger, Suncorp and QIDC were 100% Queensland Government owned. Suncorp was operating as an allfinanz group with approximately $10 billion in assets, while QIDC had total assets of $3 billion. Metway Bank was Queensland's largest locally based bank with operations in New South Wales and Victoria. At the time of the merger, Metway Bank had approximately $7.1 billion in assets. It was established as the Metropolitan Permanent Building Society in 1959. In 1988, it converted to bank status and listed on the Australian Stock Exchange (ASX). The Queensland State Government proposed the merger of the three companies to create a more competitive financial institution better geared to meet the needs of the future. The merger also created Australia's fifth largest listed financial services group with the associated economic benefits of a major Australian corporate headquarters located in Queensland. The merger and amalgamation of the three companies was completed in 1999. In May 1999, the new brand, Suncorp Metway, launched. This enabled the delivery of the group's resources under one banner, the streamlining of the product range and elimination of duplication in the branch network.

=== Reducing the State Government's share of the business ===
The state government was initially the largest shareholder of the new group with a 68% holding consisting of shares and capital notes in return for the sale of Suncorp and QIDC to Metway Bank; the other 32% was held by existing Metway shareholders. At the time, the state government indicated its intention to sell down its holding in stages within five years to no more than 15%. In September 1997, the State Government announced a public issue of 100 million Exchanging Instalment Notes giving preference to existing customers and shareholders of Suncorp, Metway and QIDC. On completion of the offer, the State Government's effective interest in the company was reduced to around 4%. The public paid $6.10 for the notes in two instalments and these exchanged for ordinary shares on 1 November 1999, increasing the number of Suncorp Metway shareholders from 36,000 to approximately 111,000.

Twelve months later the State Government announced a total sell down of its shareholding through a second Exchanging Instalment Notes issue. Like the first notes issue, the second issue attracted considerable public interest and was substantially oversubscribed. The public paid $7.10 in two instalments, the second being paid on 6 November 2000. These notes were exchanged for ordinary shares on 31 October 2001.

=== No more 'Metway' ===
On 1 July 2002, the brand was simplified to Suncorp (i.e. Metway was dropped). This branding was used for everything done in Queensland, as well as for Banking and Wealth Management outside of Queensland. The GIO brand was used for general insurance business outside of Queensland.

=== A focus on the Bank ===
On 19 April 2009 Suncorp announced a rebranding of the banking arm of the company to Suncorp Bank. Whilst the brand name of Suncorp was well known within Queensland as a bank, re-branding to Suncorp Bank supported its expansion into other states.

In July 2022, Suncorp Bank won Money Magazine's Bank of the Year Award for the fifth year in row. Today Suncorp Bank is Australia's sixth largest bank.

=== ANZ takeover ===
In July 2022, Suncorp Group agreed on terms to sell Suncorp Bank to the Australia & New Zealand Banking Group for $5 billion. In August 2023 the Australian Competition & Consumer Commission (ACCC) blocked the deal. On 20 February 2024, the Australian Competition Tribunal overturned the decision by the ACCC, paving the way for ANZ to acquire Suncorp Bank. The acquisition was completed in July 2024.

== Products and services ==
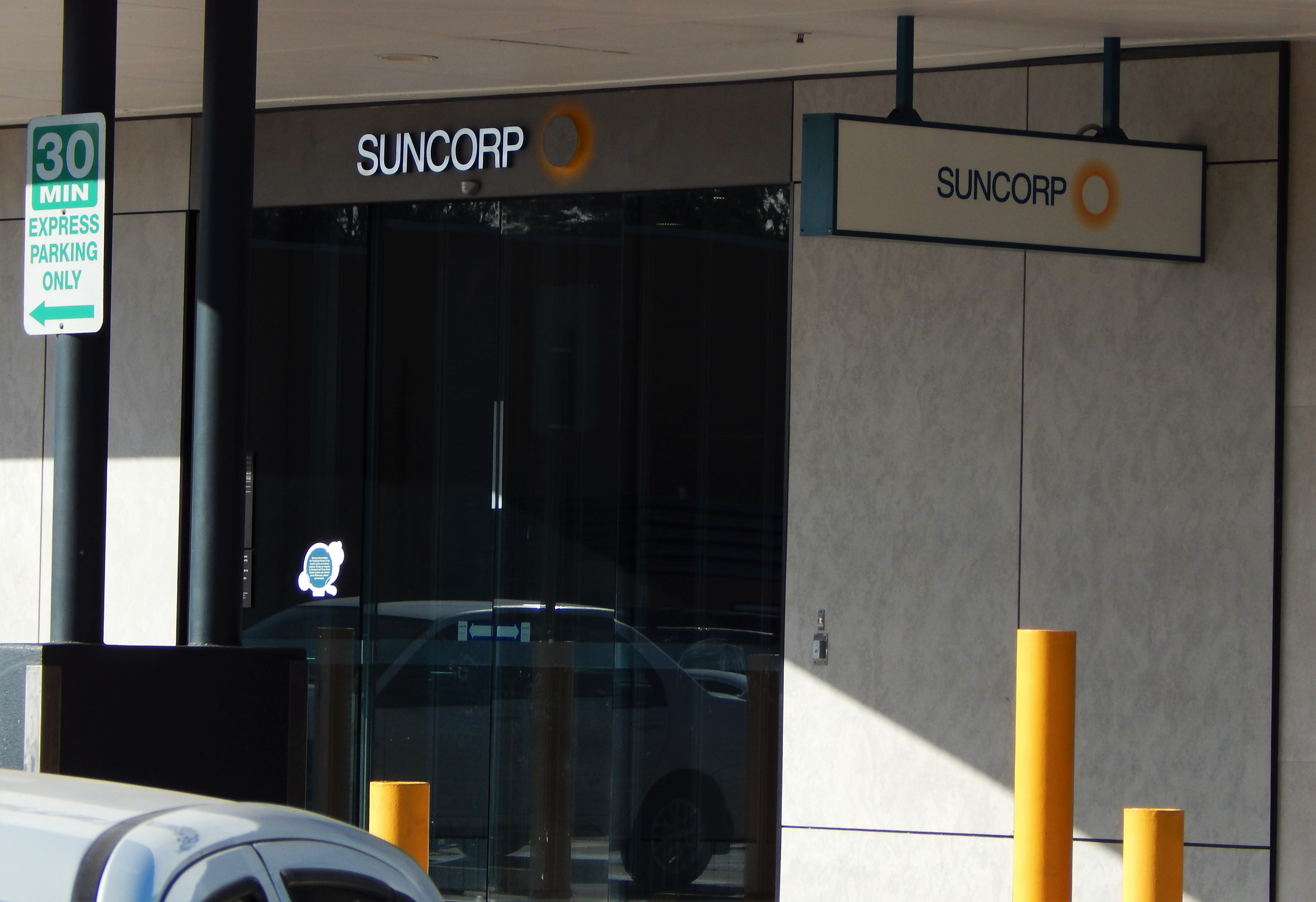
A Suncorp branch located at Stockland Rockhampton, 2022

Suncorp Bank offers the following financial services products:

- Personal (Retail) Banking – home loans, savings and transaction accounts, credit cards and foreign currency services.
- Small to Medium Enterprise Banking – financial services for owner-managed small to medium-sized enterprises with borrowing requirements of up to $1 million.
- Commercial Lending – financial services for owner-managed small to medium-sized enterprises with borrowing requirements of more than $1 million.
- Agribusiness Banking – financial services and serviced relationship management for rural producers and associated businesses in rural and regional areas.

Suncorp Bank serves its customers through its retail branch network, call centres, and mobile lenders. Customers can access their banking information via Internet Banking, Telephone Banking or using the Mobile App.
