= McGrath Foundation =

Australian charity

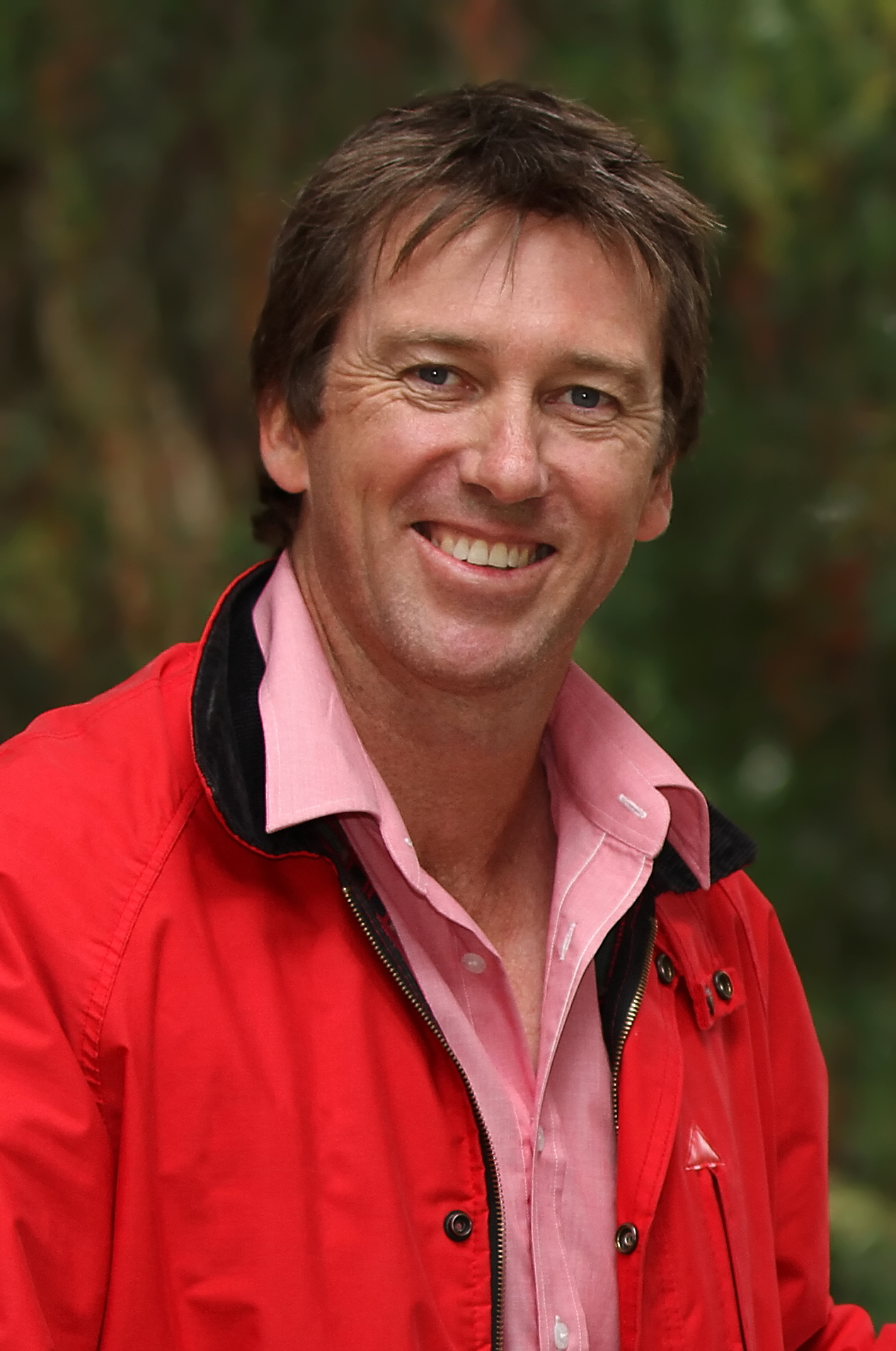
Co-founder Glen McGrath in 2011 wearing pink, the 'official' colour of the McGrath Foundation.

The McGrath Foundation is a cancer care charity in Australia. It was founded in 2005 with the aim of ensuring a Breast Care Nurse is made available for every Australian family experiencing breast cancer, regardless of location or financial situation. Australian cricket player Glenn McGrath and his English-born wife, Jane McGrath, decided to establish the charity following Jane's initial diagnosis and recovery from breast cancer. Jane McGrath died on 22 June 2008 at the age of 42. In 2025, the charity expanded to include care for all types of cancer.

== History ==
Key dates

- September 2005: McGrath Foundation established
- October 2005: Masterfoods' $1,000,000 kickstarter donation
- 2008: Federal government grants $12.6 million to place 44 breast care nurses
- January 2009: First Pink test at the SCG
- February 2010: First Pink Stumps Day (650 clubs registered)
- 2013: Federal government grants another $18.5 million to continue funding
- 2025: Over 300 McGrath cancer care nurses placed

The McGrath Foundation was created after Jane McGrath was diagnosed with breast cancer, and the mission of the foundation was based on her experiences with her nurses at that time.

Since 2005, the McGrath Foundation has placed 302 McGrath Cancer Cancer Nurses in communities across Australia, and has supported over 161,000 families.

The majority of all McGrath Breast Care Nurses are in rural and regional areas. People experiencing breast cancer can directly contact their nearest McGrath Breast Care Nurse, whose support is then provided completely free of charge. The McGrath Foundation needs to raise approximately $350,000 to place each McGrath Breast Care Nurse in the community for a three-year period.

In 2008, the Australian Government pledged $12.6 million to the McGrath Foundation to fund McGrath Breast Care Nurses in 44 communities through to June 2013. This commitment was furthered in 2013 with the announcement of a $18.5 million grant to continue funding 44 existing McGrath Breast Care Nurses in communities nationally as well as the placement of up to an additional 10 full-time equivalent McGrath Breast Care Nurse positions. This was extended for a further four years, in November 2016, confirming the positions of 57 Government-funded McGrath Breast Care Nurses until 2021.

Due to a live baiting scandal, in 2015 the McGrath Foundation suspended its relationship with Greyhound Racing Victoria. It had previously received $400,000 through the ‘‘go the pink dog’’ campaign.

Jane McGrath's daughter Holly, who was six when her mother died, works as a clinical trial administrative officer at the Peter MacCallum Cancer Centre in Victoria.

In 2019, the second day of the Lord's Test in England benefitted the Ruth Strauss Foundation in much the same way that the third day of the Sydney Test benefits the McGrath Foundation. English cricketer Andrew Strauss, who played in a Pink Test while captaining England's successful 2010-11 Ashes campaign, was widowed when his wife Ruth died from a rare form of lung cancer in 2018. Strauss had been in regular discussion with Glenn McGrath about the day.

== Breast care nurses ==
Studies have shown that women with breast cancer in rural areas struggle more than those in metropolitan areas, including high fatality rates, and that the availably and quality of breast care services affect these rates. A 2004 study found that women in regional areas of New South Wales were 35% more likely to die within five year of diagnosis versus women metropolitan areas.

McGrath breast care nurses are highly experienced and qualified; it is expected that they have five years worth of post-registration oncology or breast cancer experience and a Graduate Certificate in Breast Cancer Nursing. The foundation provides funding to allow nurses to complete the Graduate Certificate.

An evaluation of the McGrath Foundation's first breast care nurses initiative found that patient safety was increased. Based on interviewed stakeholders, the program resulted in a reduction unnecessary hospital admissions, reduced time needed by patients from medical staff and a reduced cost on the mental health system. All surveyed women who had access to a breast care nurse felt that the nurse had enhanced their quality of life.

== Pink Test and other initiatives ==
Annually, since 2009, the Test Cricket match at the Sydney Cricket Ground has been called the McGrath Foundation's Pink Test. It includes Jane McGrath Day, where many fans wear pink leading to a "sea of pink". At this event in 2024, Glenn McGrath encouraged donations to the foundation to increase the number of in-home breast cancer nurses.

Other initiatives include localised fundraisers called Pink Stumps Day and the high tea. The high tea is held annually on the day three of the Pink Test. Over its two decade history, guests to the high tea regularly include Australian prime ministers and other political leaders.

== Support ==
Several people, including cricketers and their partners, and organisations have supported the McGrath Foundation.

Tracy Bevan was Jane McGrath's best friend and is the Foundation Ambassador. Adam Gilchrist, former cricketer and Member of the Order of Australia is a vocal supporter of the McGrath Foundation. Cricketer Michael Clarke and his wife Kyly are ambassadors. In 2015 Australian female cricket and soccer player Ellyse Perry supported the McGrath Foundation's Pull on Your Socks initiative. At the Pink Test in 2019, Indian captain Virat Kohli included pink on his gloves, bat and pads in support of the McGrath Foundation. On England's 2010-11 Ashes tour of Australia, the Barmy Army raised more than £23,000 for the McGrath Foundation. An annual pink concert is held in Tamworth, in 2023 it raised nearly $17,000. Community First Credit Union offers a credit card that partially donates its annual fee to the McGrath Foundation.
