= List of international banking institutions =

List of international financial institutions:

Bank	Headquarters
African Development Bank	Abidjan, Ivory Coast
Asian Development Bank (ADB)	Manila, Philippines
Asian Infrastructure Investment Bank (AIIB)	Beijing, China
Bank for International Settlements (BIS)	Basel, Switzerland
Black Sea Trade and Development Bank (BSTDB)	Thessaloniki, Greece
Caribbean Development Bank (CDB)	Barbados
Eurasian Development Bank (EDB)	Almaty, Kazakhstan
European Bank for Reconstruction and Development (EBRD)	London, United Kingdom
European Investment Bank (EIB)	Kirchberg, Luxembourg
Inter-American Development Bank (IDB)	Washington, D.C., United States
International Monetary Fund (IMF)	Washington, D.C., United States
Islamic Development Bank	Jeddah, Saudi Arabia
New Development Bank (NDB)	Shanghai, China
Trade and Development Bank (TDB)	Bujumbura, Burundi
World Bank Group (WBG)	Washington, D.C., United States

- World Bank Group
  - International Bank for Reconstruction and Development (IBRD)
  - International Development Association (IDA)
  - International Finance Corporation (IFC)
  - Multilateral Investment Guarantee Agency (MIGA)
  - International Centre for Settlement of Investment Disputes (ICSID)

== See also ==
- List of banks in Africa
- List of banks in the Americas
- List of banks in Asia
- List of banks in Europe
- List of banks in Oceania
- Central bank
- Commercial bank
- Co-operative bank
- Credit union
- Investment bank
- Land development bank
