= Neobank =

Online-only direct bank

A neobank is a type of direct bank that operates exclusively using online banking without traditional physical branches. In contrast to direct banks, in many cases, neobanks do not have their own banking licenses, and instead rely on partner banks. They typically have lower operational costs, which can sometimes result in lower fees and more competitive interest rates.

Neobanks typically share features like:

- Digital‑only (or near‑only) operations: mobile apps, web portals; minimal or no physical branches.
- Fewer legacy systems, branch overheads and manual processes.
- Focus on user onboarding experience, real‑time notifications, simplified user interface, often gamification or budgeting tools.
- Partnerships and third‑party infrastructure: many rely on licensed banks (for deposit taking) or Banking as a Service (BaaS) platforms rather than building full banking back‑end in house.
- Monetization strategies such as interchange fees (on debit cards), subscription/premium services, lending or credit, currency services, and embedded finance offerings.
- Targeting either under‑served segments (younger users, gig economy, under‑banked countries) or offering alternative value propositions (zero/low fees, global spending, multi‑currency, real‑time analytics).

== Regulation ==
Neobanks can follow several regulatory/licensing paths:

- Full banking license: e.g., Starling Bank (UK) can take deposits and lend directly.
- Virtual bank / digital bank license: jurisdictions may issue special digital-only licenses.
- Partner bank / Banking as a service model: neobanks often partner with existing licensed banks to avoid the full regulatory burden.

Neobanks remain subject to regulatory requirements for deposits, know your customer (KYC), anti-money laundering (AML), and data privacy. Digital models can create new operational and third-party risks.

Challenges and risks about neobanks include:

- Profitability & funding: scale vs revenue concerns.
- Competition: from other neobanks and upgraded incumbents.
- Regulatory/compliance risk: AML, KYC, data protection.
- Customer trust & retention: digital-only perception risk.
- Operational/technology risk: cloud, API, third-party vulnerabilities.
- Deposit stability & funding risk: reliance on partner banks.

Report from Swedish police indicates that neobanks are popular with criminals and are frequently used in criminal transactions.

== History ==
The concept of branch-free, digital-first banking traces back to telephone-only and internet-only banks of the late 1990s and early 2000s (for example, ING Direct in the Netherlands/UK), which already emphasised low cost and online customer onboarding. Following the global financial crisis of 2008, consumer trust in established banking institutions declined significantly, creating an opening for new digital-first entrants. Between about 2010 and 2015, a number of fintech firms began offering banking-like services via apps; the term "neobank" began gaining traction from around 2017 onward.

Growth in neobanks is driven by mobile adoption, digital expectations, open banking regulation, and rapid scale via technology. Adoption is higher among younger, digitally literate populations and in countries with supportive regulatory frameworks. Profitability pressure, competition, and regulatory headwinds are notable challenges.

From the mid-2010s onward, especially in Europe and then globally, a number of dedicated digital banks emerged (for example, Monzo Bank and Revolut in the UK, Nubank in Latin America), expanding rapidly in customers, product breadth, and geographic footprint. By the early 2020s, the neobank model had become mainstream enough to attract attention from regulators, incumbents, and investors alike, with scrutiny around profitability, regulation, and sustainability.

== Regional developments ==
=== Europe ===
The development of neobanks in Europe is a trend in the European financial landscape beginning in the 2010s. The term "neobank" gained popularity in 2019, but the term’s origins are older. The term is used to describe fintech-based financial providers that were challenging traditional banks. There were two main types of company that provided services digitally: companies that applied for their own banking license and companies in a relationship with a traditional bank to provide those financial services. The former were called challenger banks and the latter were called neobanks. The term "challenger bank" is used in the UK to refer to fintech banking startups that emerged after the 2008 financial crisis. Their services may be accessed by clients through their respective computers or mobile devices.

In 2024, as a part of Instant Payments Regulation, European authorities made a significant step to level the regulatory field for neobanks. Before that, many neobanks who didn't have a bank status (like EMIs or other non-bank financial institutions) couldn't access central bank-operated payment systems like TARGET. TARGET Services are essential to many money-transferring operations. With this new regulation, non-bank payment service providers (PSP) meeting certain requirements can connect to these systems. The initiative should help neobanks and fintechs to provide instant credit transfers in euros and compete with traditional banks.

=== Oceania ===
==== Australia ====
Neobanks are operational in Australia and include banks such as Up, Judo Bank, and Alex Bank.

=== Asia ===
==== Bangladesh ====
The concept of neobanks was first noted in Bangladesh around 2020. These banks would be digital only with customer accounts not connected to any particular branch.

==== India ====
In India, a neobank is a class of digital-only or online bank that operates without physical branch locations. Neobanks often partner with well-established, traditional banks to provide services and adhere to regulations.

Neobanks in India typically offer a range of financial services, including savings accounts, current accounts, debit and credit cards, and other banking services. They focus on providing a seamless and user-friendly digital banking experience to a younger audience, with features like instant account setup, easy money transfers, and expense tracking. Some neobanks also target specific customer segments, such as millennials, and offer features like budgeting tools and investment options to that demographic.

Indian neobanks primarily operate in Indian rupees and may have limited cross-border services. International transactions are often handled in partnerships with traditional banks. Federal Bank has partnered with Jupiter and Fi in the neo-banking space.

==== Iran ====
Neobanks in Iran are legally digital branches of banks. Central Bank passed a limiting law in 2022 which bans banks from starting mobile "neo" bank apps that have their own core. There are a number of active programs such as Omid Bank, Tobank, Wepod and Zpod Kidzy, Bank Mellat Plus. Iranians need Identity national smart cards and video confirmation to open an account.

==== United Arab Emirates ====
The United Arab Emirates has emerged as the leading neobank market in the Middle East and North Africa (MENA) region. The digital banking sector in the Middle East grew by 52% between 2021 and mid-2023, with MENA neobanks serving approximately 32 million customers by 2025. Unlike European markets where neobanks typically operate as independent entities, UAE neobanks have predominantly been established by traditional banks, with Emirates NBD's Liv platform, Mashreq Neo, and the independently licensed Zand and Wio Bank among the leading operators. The Central Bank of the UAE (CBUAE) has supported the sector through an open finance regulation enabling third-party access to customer financial data, while the country's Dubai International Financial Centre operates a regulatory sandbox facilitating new digital banking entrants. As of 2022, one in five UAE adults held a neobank account, with projections suggesting over 40% of the country's banking population will use neobank services by 2027.

== See also ==
- Online banking
- Fintech
