= Community First Bank =

Australian community based credit union

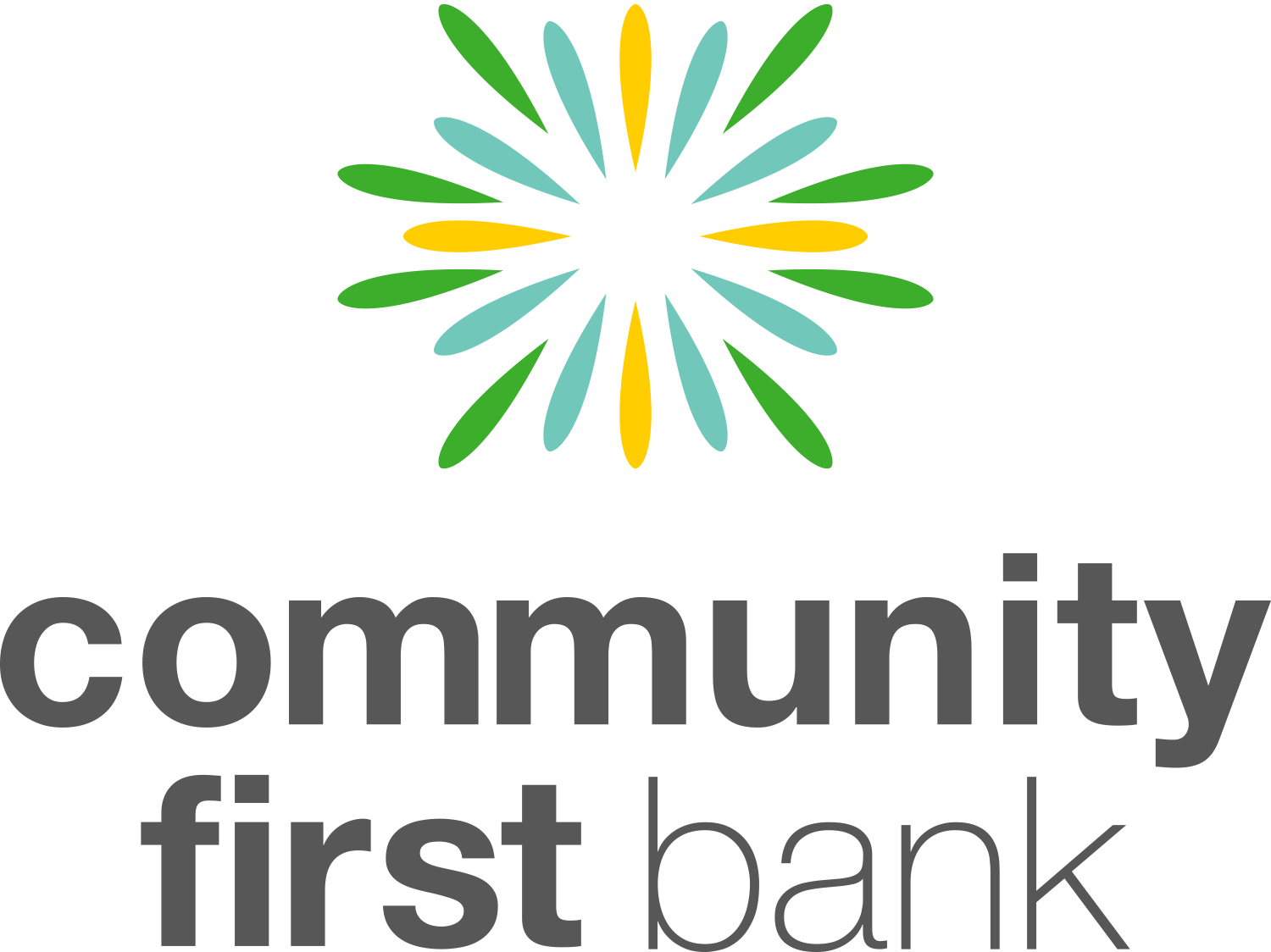
- Type: Private
- Industry: Banking, financial services
- Predecessor: Sydney Water Board Credit Union, Elcom Credit Union, and Community First Credit Union
- Founded: 1959 as Sydney Water Board Officers Credit Union
- Headquarters: Auburn, Sydney, New South Wales, Australia
- Number of locations: 13 branches
- Area served: Australia
- Key people: Anthony Perkiss (CEO)
- Products: Loans; Mortgages; Credit cards; Insurance; Consumer banking
- Number of employees: 122 (2015)
- Website: communityfirst.com.au

Community First Bank is an Australian member or customer-owned community-focused bank established in Sydney in 1959 as Sydney Water Board Officers Credit Union with branches in Sydney and the central coast region

The bank has formerly operated under the names, or merged with Elcom Credit Union, SWB Family Credit Union, SWB Community Credit Union, The Lakes Power Station Employees Credit Union, Illawarra Credit Union, Dana Employees Credit Union, Croatian Community Credit Union, and Hibernian Credit Union .

== History ==
=== Sydney Water Board Credit Union ===
In 1959 The Sydney Water Board Officers Credit Union was founded. At the formation meeting on 5 August 1959, 63 employees became the first members of Sydney Water Board Credit Union Co-op. Membership was originally restricted to permanent employees in the Metropolitan Water, Sewerage & Drainage Board's (predecessor of Sydney Water) head office. Loans were limited to £300 ($600 at the 1966 conversion rate). By the end of its first financial year the credit union had 331 members and £15,565 ($31,130) in assets.

In 1961 the loan limit was raised to £750 ($1,500). By the end of the 61-62 financial year, there were 1,052 members with assets of £127,429 ($254,858). In 1964 the credit union became automated with the purchase of its first NCR National Accounting Machine to maintain members' accounts. In 1967 the Board approved a change of name to the Sydney Water Board Employees Credit Union. 1968 saw the Credit Union purchase a new, four-storey head office – 'Co-operation House' at 125 Bathurst St, Sydney, for the sum of $250,000. In 1972 Full computerisation of the member accounts and transactions were completed. In 1973 through to 1976 Ongoing expansion during this period lead to offices being opened in Wollongong, Miranda, Penrith and Liverpool. Membership was opened beyond the original base of Water Board employees, to include the Board's contractors and manufacturers. The credit union merged with the employee credit unions of TAA (Trans Australia Airlines), Glass Containers and Sterlec.

=== SWB Family Credit Union ===
The TAA connection also provided the credit union's first non-Water Board and female director, Margaret Slater. In 1974, in line with the changing membership profile, the name of the credit union was changed to SWB Family Credit Union Ltd. In 1978 the credit union became the 12th largest in Australia, with 16,420 members and assets of $14,039,267. In 1981 SWB Family Credit Union merged with Martin Wells Credit Union. In 1981 the credit union moved into most of Penrith as a credit union for all residents, not just employees with payroll deductions. This was followed in 1983 by a similar expansion in Liverpool, and in 1984 to the Shire of Hornsby. New offices were also opened in Campbelltown, North Ryde and Dee Why.

=== SWB Community Credit Union ===
The transformation from a work-based credit union to a more community-based one prompted another name change, to S.W.B. Community Credit Union Ltd. In 1983 the Rediteller ATM network was launched and all members were issued with Redicards, for use in some 500 ATMs nationwide. In 1984, the Credit Union Visa Card gave members debit-card access to their funds almost anywhere in the world. At this time there was also a merger with AMOCO Employees Credit Union. Membership grew to 21,941, with deposits of $28,585,671 and total assets of $31,756,576. In 1986 the Credit Union merged with Wool Broker and Trustees Staff Credit Union. In 1989 the credit union had 31,355 members with total assets of $75,615,583. It granted loans worth $35,530,000 in that year. The Bathurst Street building was sold and head office was relocated to Auburn. In 1990 there was another local merger this time with Muniff Credit Union.

=== Community First Credit Union ===
In 1993 members resolved to change the name of the credit union from SWB Community Credit Union Ltd to Community First Credit Union. Membership eligibility was expanded to include everybody in the Greater Sydney area. By 1999 membership exceeded 57,000, with deposits of $210 million and loans worth $199 million and another merger this time with Manchester Unity Credit Union Ltd. In 2000 there was a merger with Grand United Credit Union. In 2001 an internet banking facility was introduced in September giving members 24/7 access to their accounts. Assets exceeded $300 million for the first time.

In 2002 Community First Credit Union launched an online brand Easy Street Financial Services, providing members nationwide with a high interest online savings account. The credit union also became sponsors of the Sheppard Centre, providing support for deaf children and their families. In 2006 Community First Credit Union merged with Dana Employees Credit Union. A brand make-over also occurs, with new logo and corporate colours.

On 12 May 2006, the Chief Executive Officer, Paul Johnson, together with John Tancevski, the Chief Executive Officer of Community First Credit Union announced the intention for the two organisations to merge. Its head office is located at Auburn. The merger, subject to Australian Prudential Regulation Authority approvals will be voted on at the Annual General Meetings of both Credit Unions in October, with the merge to take effect on 1 November 2006. The merged entity would be called Community First Credit Union having its head office at Auburn and a regional office at Gorokan.

In 2008 Community First Credit Union merged with the Croatian Community Credit Union and Hibernian Credit Union – adding 2,000 new members.

=== Elcom Credit Union merger ===
Elcom Credit Union was a community-based credit union in Australia that was formed in 1966 at Newvale Colleries Doyalson as Newstan Colliery Employees Credit Union. The name was changed to Elcom Credit Union following the acquisition on Newvale Colleries by Elcom Colleries during the 1970s.

Elcom Credit Union operated from its head office at Elcom Colleries at Doyalson. Until 1983 the only way for members to access their funds was by cheque delivered by a courier. At this stage Elcom had 3125 members nearly $6,000,000 in assets. In 1983 a Special General Meeting was held where it was decided that membership would be open to the community at large thus becoming a community based credit union rather than an industrial credit union. Subsequently, five branches were opened at Toukley, Toronto, Morisset, Swansea and Wyong.

In May 1987, Elcom held a Special General Meeting where it was decided that the credit union be merged with The Lakes Power Station Employees Credit Union. Prior to the merge, Elcom had 6,492 members and more than $15,000,000 in assets. The merge resulted in new branches at Eraring Power Station, Vales Point Power Station, Gorokan and The Entrance as well as agencies at Liddell State Mine and Belmont Sportsmans Club and a larger branch presence at Munmorah Power Station. Earlier in the year Elcom had moved its head office from Doyalson to Morisset following changes at Munmorah Power Station. Following the merger, it was relocated to the Lakes' head office at Gorokan. The branch there was closed in 1998, but continued operating as Head Office until October 2006.

New branches were opened at Erina (1991), Woy Woy (1993), Lake Haven (1994) and Glendale (1996). The agencies were closed (1988), as were the branches at The Entrance (1989) and the power stations (1992). Wyong branch was moved to Tuggerah in 1994 to coincide with the opening of Westfield Shoppingtown. As well as this Elcom broadened its product range to include products such as insurance, cheque books, ATM access and travellers cheques.

First Choice Travel was a venture by Elcom Credit Union with Holiday Coast Credit Union that began in December 1999 with the opening of Garden City (now Westfield Kotara) branch and has since been incorporated into several branches as well as at Port Macquarie. Elcom Credit Union's two-thirds share of First Choice Travel was sold in December 2005 to Hunter Travel Group but continues to be associated with the Credit Union.

During March 2005 Elcom Credit Union adopted a new logo and uniform with new branch signage also being put into place.

It officially ceased trading as a deposit-taking institution on 31 October 2006 when it merged with Community First Credit Union. At the time of merging Elcom had seven branches, 50 staff, 22,000 members and assets of $143,000,000.Paul Johnson has been Chief Executive Officer since 2003 .

=== Northern Beaches Credit Union merger ===
On 1 December 2015, the Northern Beaches Credit Union merged with Community First Credit union.

=== Cape Credit Union merger ===
On Sep 2018, the Cape Credit Union merged with Community First Credit union.

=== Community First Bank ===
In 2022, Community First Credit Union commenced the transition to become Community First Bank. Community First won the right to call themselves a bank following their successful trademark dispute with Bendigo and Adelaide Bank in 2021. They successfully fought for the right of customer-owned mutuals to call themselves 'community banks', and in winning the dispute, they commenced the process to begin referring to their brand as 'Community First Bank'.

In October 2024 FCCU announced a planned merger with the Illawarra Credit Union. In 2025, the merger was successful, with the entity trading as Community First Bank.

== Sponsorship ==
In 2009 in association with cricketer Glenn McGrath and the McGrath Foundation, the McGrath Pink Visa Credit Card was launched. Half the card's annual fee of $20 is donated to the McGrath Foundation which supports women with breast cancer by providing nurses. Currently membership exceeds 65,000, with assets reaching $738 million.

Community First Bank continues to sponsor the Queenscliff Surf Life Saving Club. Having originated more than 19 years ago via Northern Beaches credit Union, the sponsorship helps fund the cost of a new surf lifesaving boat each year while supporting the club’s important work in keeping beach-goers safe.
