= GIO Insurance =

Australian insurance provider

GIO
- Industry: General insurance
- Founded: 1927; 99 years ago
- Headquarters: Sydney, Australia
- Products: Motor vehicle insurance (car, motorcycle, caravan, NSW CTP and ACT MAI); Home insurance; Travel insurance; Business insurance; Life insurance
- Parent: Suncorp
- Website: www.gio.com.au

GIO is an Australian general insurance provider. It offers insurance products, such as car, home and contents, CTP, boat, caravan, travel, business, public liability and workers compensation and life, primarily in the state of New South Wales and the Australian Capital Territory. The insurer was founded as the Government Insurance Office New South Wales in 1927 to provide workers compensation insurance and adopted the name, GIO. The insurer listed on the Australian Securities Exchange in August 1992 and in January 1999 was acquired by AMP. In 2001, Suncorp acquired GIO as part of AMP's general insurance interests.

== History ==
GIO was founded as the Government Insurance Office in 1927 by the Government Insurance Act of New South Wales. It was established to provide workers compensation insurance under the Workers' Compensation Act of 1926 and to take over activities previously carried out by the NSW Treasury Insurance Branch. The Act was amended over the years to widen its scope to life insurance.

In 1989 the name GIO Australia was adopted to reflect the business nationwide. In April 1991, an association was formed with the Home Building Society in Western Australia which made GIO's personal and life insurance products available through 30 Home Building Society outlets. It also acquired the State Insurance Office of Victoria in 1992 from the Victorian state government.

GIO listed on the Australian Securities Exchange in July 1992 following a public and institutional offer.

In January 1999, AMP acquired a 57% shareholding. In September 1999, AMP launched a successful takeover bid for the remaining shares.

On 1 July 2001, Suncorp acquired AMP's Australian general insurance interests, including GIO. On acquisition, the Suncorp's general insurance customer base doubled and the business mix became more diversified, with growth in personal and business lines and the addition of workers compensation.

On 1 July 2013, as part of a Federal Court of Australia approved internal re-organisation, the Suncorp's Australian general insurance businesses were transferred to one underwriter, AAI Limited. Today AAI Limited trades as GIO and issues GIO general insurance products.

== Products ==
GIO offers the following products and services: motor vehicle insurance, compulsory third-party insurance in New South Wales and the Australian Capital Territory, home and contents insurance, caravan insurance, boat insurance, life insurance, travel insurance, business insurance, and worker's compensation insurance.

== Case law ==
A High Court of Australia decision of 1965, in the case of Government Insurance Office of NSW v RJ Green and Lloyd Pty Ltd (1965), discussed the meaning of the words "arising out of", when these words are used in an insurance policy. The insurance policy in this case included provision for

all liability incurred by the [insured] in respect of the death or bodily injury to any person caused by or arising out of the use of the motor vehicle.

The Court held that "arising out of" allowed for wider and less immediate interpretation of responsibility than the words "caused by".

== Sponsorships ==
GIO was naming rights sponsor of Australian Touring Car Championship team Bob Forbes Racing from 1989 until 1993. Since 2014 it has been the naming rights sponsor of Canberra Stadium.
