= Lists of banks =

Lists of banks are contained in the following articles:

== By continent ==
- List of banks in Africa – each country in Africa has a list of banks operating in that country
- List of banks in Asia – each country in Asia has a list of banks operating in that country
- List of banks in the Americas – each country in the Americas has a list of banks with operations in that country
- List of banks in Europe – each country in Europe has a list of banks operating in that country
- List of banks in Oceania – each country in Oceania has a list of banks operating in that country

== By super continent or intercontinental region ==
- List of banks in the Arab world – each Arab country has a list of banks operating in that country
- List of largest banks in ASEAN – each country in Southeast Asia has a list of banks with operations in that country

== Other lists ==
- List of central banks
- List of international banking institutions – list of international and multilateral financial institutions
- List of systemically important banks – list of banks deemed systemically important by at least one major regulator
- List of largest banks – list of largest banks as measured by market capitalization and total assets on balance sheet
- List of investment banks – list of investment banks and brokerages

== See also ==
- List of oldest banks in continuous operation
