= List of banks in Oceania =

This is a list of banks in Oceania

== Australia ==
=== Central bank ===
- Reserve Bank of Australia

=== Major banks ===
- ANZ Bank
  - Suncorp
- Commonwealth Bank
  - Bankwest
- Macquarie Bank
- National Australia Bank
- Westpac
  - BankSA
  - Bank of Melbourne
  - St George Bank

=== Foreign banks ===
- HSBC Bank Australia
- ING Bank Australia
- Rabobank Australia

=== Local banks ===
- Bank of Queensland
  - ME Bank
- Bendigo & Adelaide Bank

=== Defunct banks ===
- State Bank of Victoria
- State Bank of New South Wales
- Advance Bank
- Bank of Melbourne

== Fiji ==
=== Central bank ===
- Reserve Bank of Fiji

=== Local banks ===
- Bank of South Pacific
- ANZ (Fiji)
- HFC (Fiji)
- Westpac (Fiji)
- Bank of Baroda
- BRED Bank (Fiji)

== Kiribati ==
=== Central bank ===
- Development Bank of Kiribati
- Alkami Bank
- Bandhan Bank
- Kiraboshi Bank
- Business Link Pacific Bank

== Micronesia ==
=== Central bank ===
- FSMDB
- DFCC Bank

== New Zealand ==
=== Central bank ===
- Reserve Bank of New Zealand

=== Local banks ===
- ASB Bank
- Bank of New Zealand
- Heartland Bank
- Kiwibank
- SBS Bank
- TSB Bank

=== Foreign banks ===
- ANZ Bank New Zealand
- Bank of Baroda
- Bank of China
- Bank of India
- China Construction Bank
- Commonwealth Bank
- Deutsche Bank
- Industrial & Commercial Bank of China
- Kookmin Bank
- MUFG Bank
- Rabobank New Zealand
- Westpac New Zealand

== Nauru ==
- Bank of Nauru
- Bendigo Bank

== Papua New Guinea ==
=== Central bank ===
- Bank of Papua New Guinea

=== Local banks ===
- Bank South Pacific
- ANZ Bank Papua New Guinea
- Westpac Bank Papua New Guinea
- Maybank Papua New Guinea
- Mama Bank
- National Development Bank of Papua New Guinea
- Nationwide Micro Bank

== Solomon Islands ==
=== Central Bank ===
- Central Bank of Solomon Islands

=== Local Banks ===
- Bank of South Pacific
- Pan Oceanic Bank
- ANZ Solomon Islands
- BRED Bank Solomon
- Development Bank of Solomon Islands

=== Defunct Banks ===
- National Bank of Solomon Islands (dissolved into BSP)
- Westpac Solomon Islands

== Western Samoa ==
=== Central bank ===
- Central Bank of Samoa

=== Foreign banks ===
- Australia and New Zealand Banking Group Limited (ANZ)

=== Local banks ===
- Bank South Pacific (BSP)
- National Bank of Samoa
- Samoa Commercial Bank

== Tonga ==
=== Central bank ===
- National Reserve Bank of Tonga

=== Foreign banks ===
- Australia and New Zealand Banking Group Limited (ANZ)

=== Local banks ===
- Bank South Pacific (BSP)
- MBf Bank
- Tonga Development Bank

=== Defunct banks ===
- Pacific International Commercial Bank

== Vanuatu ==
=== Central bank ===
- Reserve Bank of Vanuatu
- Vantu Bank
- Wanfuteng Bank

=== Foreign banks ===
- Australia and New Zealand Banking Group Limited (ANZ)

=== Local banks ===
- Bank South Pacific (BSP)
- National Bank of Vanuatu
