= Banking in Australia =

Banking in Australia is a central component of the country's financial system and one of the most concentrated banking sectors in the world. As of 2025 the sector contributes 7.5% of GDP and employs 450,000 people.

The industry is dominated by the “Big Four” banks; Commonwealth Bank, Westpac, Australia & New Zealand Bank, and National Australia Bank, which together hold the majority of deposits and lending. The sector is regulated by the Reserve Bank of Australia (RBA), which manages monetary policy and financial stability, and the Australian Prudential Regulation Authority (APRA), which oversees prudential standards. Australian banks are noted for their profitability, systemic importance, and resilience, particularly during the global financial crisis of 2007–2008.

Banking in Australia has its origins in the early nineteenth century, when colonial banks were established to support trade, settlement, and pastoral expansion. The sector experienced rapid growth but also instability, culminating in the banking crisis of 1893, which led to widespread bank failures and restructuring. Through the twentieth century, the system was shaped by government intervention, wartime controls, and the establishment of the Commonwealth Bank as both a commercial and central bank. Post-war reforms and the creation of the RBA in 1959 marked the beginning of a modern regulatory framework.

From the 1980s, financial deregulation transformed the industry. The removal of interest rate controls, floating of the Australian dollar, and entry of foreign banks increased competition and innovation. At the same time, prudential regulation was strengthened to safeguard stability, with APRA created in 1998 to supervise banks, insurers, and superannuation funds. The sector has since embraced digital banking, electronic payments, and online services, making Australia one of the more technologically advanced banking markets.

Despite its strength, the industry has faced scrutiny over misconduct, consumer protection, and market concentration. The Royal Commission into Misconduct in the Banking, Superannuation and Financial Services Industry (2017–2019) exposed widespread failings and led to significant reforms. Australian banks continue to play a pivotal role in the Asia–Pacific region, balancing domestic stability with international expansion. The sector remains a subject of debate over competition, regulation, and its role in supporting sustainable economic growth.

== Financial institutions ==
Deregulation of the financial sector commenced in the mid-1960s, with the removal of the distinction between and separation of trading and savings banks. Building societies were allowed to take deposits from the public. Banking in Australia is notable by the small number of large banks in the market. Much of this concentration is the result of bank acquisitions. English, Scottish and Australian Bank was acquired by the ANZ Bank in 1970. In 1982, the Bank of New South Wales merged with the Commercial Bank of Australia to form Westpac. There were many other bank mergers and acquisitions throughout Australia's banking history. Beginning in the 1980s, several building societies sought to convert to banks, but were required to demutualise before they were permitted to do so. This included NSW Building Society, which became Advance Bank, St George, Suncorp, Metway Bank, Challenge Bank, Bank of Melbourne and Bendigo Bank. A change in regulations allowed building societies and credit unions to become banks without having to demutualise, and several including Heritage Bank have converted since 2011 while retaining their status and structure as mutual organisations.

=== Big four banks ===
In 1990, the government adopted a "four pillars policy" in relation to banking in Australia and announced that it would reject any mergers between the big four banks. This is long-standing policy rather than formal regulation, but it reflects the broad political unpopularity of further bank mergers. A number of commentators have argued that the "four pillars policy" is built upon economic fallacies and works against Australia's better interests.

The four pillars policy does not prevent the four major banks from acquiring smaller competitors. In 2000, CBA acquired the Colonial Group, which had emerged as a major bank–insurance combine in the 1990s, after the Colonial Mutual insurance group took over State Bank of New South Wales in 1994. The Commonwealth Bank also acquired the State Bank of Victoria in 1990 and Bankwest in 2008. Westpac acquired Challenge Bank in 1995, Bank of Melbourne in 1997, and St George Bank in 2008.

Currently, banking in Australia is dominated by four major banks: Commonwealth Bank, Westpac, ANZ Bank and the National Australia Bank. The top four banking groups in Australia ranked by market capitalisation at share price:

| Rank | Company | Market capitalisation (2025) | Cash earnings (2025) | Total assets (2025) |
|---|---|---|---|---|
| 1 | Commonwealth Bank (CBA) | A$254.80 billion | A$10.13 billion | A$1,353.80 billion |
| 2 | Westpac (Westpac) | A$127.46 billion | A$6.92 billion | A$1,125.36 billion |
| 3 | National Australia Bank (NAB) | A$122.15 billion | A$6.76 billion | A$1,109.06 billion |
| 4 | Australia & New Zealand Banking Group (ANZ) | A$102.14 billion | A$5.93 billion | A$1,297.11 billion |

=== Medium banks ===
Since 2000, there have been between 5 and 7 medium banks operating in Australia, defined as holding between 1% and 10% of resident assets. The 5 banks in this category have an aggregate market share of around 12%. As of September 2024, there were five medium banks operating in Australia:

- Macquarie Bank
- Bank of Queensland
- Bendigo and Adelaide Bank
- ING Australia
- HSBC Australia

These medium banks include two regional banks, the Bendigo and Adelaide Bank and the Bank of Queensland (including its retail arms ME Bank and Virgin Money). Macquarie Bank is part of the larger financial services group, Macquarie Group, while two other medium banks are subsidiaries of large foreign banks, such as ING Australia and HSBC Bank Australia.

Former medium banks include Bankwest and St George Bank, acquired by the Commonwealth Bank and Westpac respectively in 2008, and Citibank Australia, acquired by NAB in 2022. Suncorp was also acquired in 2022 by ANZ.

=== Mutual banking in Australia ===
The Customer Owned Banking Association is the industry body representing 48 credit unions, building societies and mutual banks that constitute the Australian mutual or cooperative banking sector. Due to a large number of mergers, the number of individual member-owned banking institutions in Australia has been decreasing since the beginning of the twenty-first century, from 185 institutions in 2004 to 54 in 2024.

Mutual banks hold two-thirds of the 6% of assets held by small and very small banks. Collectively, Australian customer-owned banks service 5 million customers or 'members' (as they are mutual shareholders in the institutions); they are the primary financial institution for over 10% of Australians and they run 18% of all bank branches.

The largest customer-owned banks in Australia are:

| Rank | Institution | Total assets (July 2026) | Members (July 2026) | Also trading as |
|---|---|---|---|---|
| 1 | People First Bank | A$29.901 billion | >740,000 | • People's Choice • Heritage Bank |
| 2 | NGM Group | A$27.868 billion | >600,000 | • Greater Bank • Newcastle Permanent |
| 3 | Great Southern Bank | A$25.988 billion | <420,000 | • Credit Union Australia Ltd |
| 4 | Bank Australia | A$23.554 billion | 196,160 | • Qudos Bank |
| 5 | Teachers Mutual Bank | A$16.714 billion | >280,000 | • Australian Mutual Bank • Health Professionals Bank • Firefighters Mutual Bank • UniBank |
| 6 | Beyond Bank | A$16.632 billion | 334,779 | • Family First Bank |
| 7 | P&N Bank | A$11.757 billion | ~125,000 | • BCU Bank • Police & Nurses Ltd |
| 8 | IMB Bank | A$11.174 billion | ~219,000 | |
| 9 | Regional Australia Bank | A$6.377 billion | >100,000 | • Summerland Bank • Macquarie Credit Union |
| 10 | Defence Bank | A$5.389 billion | >81,000 | |
| 11 | Unity Bank | A$4.919 billion | >60,000 | • G&C Mutual Bank • Reliance Bank |
| 12 | Bank First | A$4.838 billion | 90,855 | • Victorian Teachers Ltd |

A number of credit unions and building societies changed their business names to include the word 'bank', to overcome adverse perceptions of smaller deposit-taking entities. For example, in September 2011 Bank Australia (formerly Bankmecu) was announced as Australia's first customer-owned bank. Three teachers' credit unions have become known as 'banks'; namely, RACQ Bank (formerly the Queensland Teachers' Credit Union), Bank First (formerly the Victoria Teachers' Credit Union), and Teachers Mutual Bank (formerly Teachers Credit Union). The Police & Nurses' Credit Union began trading as P&N Bank in March 2013, and some credit unions are electing to use 'mutual banking' as a business tagline, rather than as a business name, as they do not meet the criteria to be called a 'bank'.

=== Foreign banks ===
Foreign banks wishing to carry on a banking business in Australia must obtain a banking authority issued by APRA under the Banking Act, either to operate as a wholesale bank through an Australian branch or to conduct business through an Australian-incorporated subsidiary. Foreign banks engaging in retail banking require a full banking licence. Foreign banks which do not wish to obtain a banking authority in Australia may operate a representative office in Australia for liaison purposes, but the activities of that office will be restricted.

According to the Foreign Investment Review Board, foreign investment in the Australian banking sector needs to be consistent with the Banking Act, the Financial Sector (Shareholdings) Act 1998 and banking policy, including prudential requirements. Any proposed foreign takeover or acquisition of an Australian bank will be considered on a case-by-case basis and judged on its merits.

There are a number of foreign subsidiary banks, however only a few have a retail banking presence; ING Bank (Australia) Limited (trading as ING), HSBC Bank Australia (a subsidiary of HSBC), Delphi Bank (formerly the 'Bank of Cyprus Australia', and in 2012 acquired by Bendigo & Adelaide Bank), Bank of Sydney (with a full banking licence since 2001) have a small number of branches.

Foreign banks have a more significant presence in the Australian merchant banking sector.

== Regulation ==
Formally, there is extensive and detailed regulation of Australia's banking system, split mainly between the Australian Prudential Regulation Authority (APRA) and Australian Securities & Investments Commission (ASIC). The Reserve Bank of Australia also has an important involvement. However, in practice, banks in Australia are self-regulated through external dispute resolution (EDR) schemes, the most prominent of which is the Australian Financial Complaints Authority (AFCA).

APRA is responsible for the licensing and prudential supervision of authorised deposit-taking institutions (ADIs) (banks, building societies, credit unions, friendly societies and participants in certain credit card schemes and certain purchaser payment facilities), as well as life and general insurance companies and superannuation funds. APRA issues capital adequacy guidelines for banks which are consistent with the Basel II guidelines. All financial institutions regulated by APRA are required to report on a periodic basis to APRA. Certain financial intermediaries, such as investment banks (which do not otherwise operate as ADIs) are neither licensed nor regulated under the Banking Act and are not subject to the prudential supervision of APRA. They may be required to obtain licences under the Corporations Act 2001 or other Commonwealth or State legislation, depending on the nature of their business activities in Australia.

ASIC has responsibility for market integrity and consumer protection and the regulation of certain financial institutions (including investment banks and finance companies). However, ASIC does not actually investigate any issues or propose any regulations that concern consumer protection, this authority is delegated to the EDR schemes and the Australian Competition & Consumer Commission (ACCC). Since 1 November 2018 the single external dispute resolution scheme for financial services has been the Australian Financial Complaints Authority (AFCA), which replaced the Financial Ombudsman Service, the Credit and Investments Ombudsman and the statutory Superannuation Complaints Tribunal. ASIC's Regulatory Guide 267 sets out which financial firms must be AFCA members and how ASIC oversees AFCA.

Banks are also subject to obligations under the Anti-Money Laundering and Counter-Terrorism Financing Act 2006 as "reporting entities". They are required to identify and monitor customers using a risk-based approach, develop and maintain a compliance program, and report to Australian Transaction Reports and Analysis Centre certain cash transactions as well as suspicious matters and file annual compliance reports.

There have been calls in recent times for an added level of regulation of banks following lending, foreign exchange, and financial planning controversies between 2009 and 2017, highlighted in 2016 Senate inquiries. Referring to white collar crime, ASIC's Chairman Greg Medcraft said 'This is a bit of paradise, Australia, for white collar [crime]'. In December 2017 the Australian Government established the Royal Commission into Misconduct in the Banking, Superannuation and Financial Services Industry to inquire into and report on misconduct in the banking, superannuation and financial services industry. The interim report from the Royal Commission prompted the industry to revamp its banking code. The code has been criticised as needing to be legally binding, strictly liable and breaches criminal.

== Interbank lending market ==
During the course of every day, each bank executes a large number of transactions, such as payroll, retail and business purchases, credit card payments, etc. Some involve cash (or its equivalent) coming into the bank and others of cash going out. Banks do not have a reliable way of predicting what or how much those transactions will be. At the end of each day banks must reconcile their positions. The bank that finds itself with a surplus of cash would miss out earning interest on the cash, even if it's for only one night. Other banks may find that they had more money going out than coming in, and the bank must borrow cash to cover the shortfall. To meet its liquidity obligations, the bank with the shortfall would borrow from a bank with a surplus in the interbank lending market. Depending on the bank's assessment of the type of shortfall and costs, the bank may take out an overnight loan, the interest rate of which is based on the cash rate, which is set by the Reserve Bank (RBA) every month (currently 0.10%); or else take out a "short duration loan", known as "prime bank paper", for a term of between one and six months and whose interest rate is called the "bank bill swap rate" (BBSW), which is set by the commercial banks.

Until July 2017 a body called the Australian Financial Markets Association (AFMA) determined the BBSW rate. Since July 2017 the ASX calculates the rate. Until 2013, AFMA would every morning at 10am ask each of the "prime banks" what interest rates they will be offering or asking for that day. AFMA would then calculate the BBSW rate as the average of those quotes. Normally, the longer the term, the higher the offered rate. The system required some level of subjective judgement by the banks, because there was a rapidly changing market on multiple broker screens. AFMA changed the method of calculating the BBSW rate to be based on a multimarket electronic feed of live bids and offers. ASX would later add the use of market transactions in addition to these live bids and offers. Besides affecting the BBSW rate, many other financial rates are based on it. The Australian Securities & Investments Commission (ASIC) monitors the BBSW system.

There arises from time to time a situation when there are insufficient funds in the interbank lending market to enable the banks to balance their books. Some banks, for example, may be experiencing a bank run or may be withholding funds from the market expecting a heightened demand in the near future. The Reserve Bank's role includes ensuring liquidity in the banking system, including acting as lender of last resort in times of a liquidity crisis.

== International cooperation ==
=== FATCA ===
The United States has enacted the Foreign Account Tax Compliance Act. (FATCA) which came into effect on 1 July 2014, which aims to prevent tax evasion by US tax residents who hold foreign accounts by requiring foreign financial institutions to report details and interest income to the US Internal Revenue Service (IRS).

Australia has signed an Intergovernmental Agreement (IGA) with the United States which sets out rules to enable Australian financial institutions to report to the Australian Taxation Office (ATO) which in turn passes the information to the IRS. FATCA affects US citizens, US tax residents and certain types of organisations that are controlled by them. To comply with FATCA, Australian banks ask customers to declare their US tax status.

=== Trans-Tasman Council on Banking Supervision ===
The Trans-Tasman Council on Banking Supervision (TTBC) was established in 2005 as a joint initiative of the Australian and New Zealand governments to strengthen cooperation on the regulation and supervision of banks operating across both countries. The Council was created in response to the high degree of integration between the two banking systems, particularly the dominance of the four major Australian banks in New Zealand's financial sector.

The TTBC brings together representatives from the Australian Treasury, the New Zealand Treasury, the Australian Prudential Regulation Authority (APRA), the Reserve Bank of Australia (RBA), the Australian Securities and Investments Commission (ASIC), the Reserve Bank of New Zealand (RBNZ), and the New Zealand Financial Markets Authority (FMA).

Its objectives include:

- promoting a coordinated approach to prudential supervision and crisis management of trans‑Tasman banking groups;
- enhancing information sharing between regulators;
- ensuring that each jurisdiction's regulatory decisions take into account potential impacts on the other; and
- developing joint crisis‑management protocols and conducting cross‑border simulation exercises.

Legislative changes in both countries have reinforced this cooperation. For example, APRA and the RBNZ are required to consider the financial stability of the other jurisdiction when making decisions affecting banks with operations on both sides of the Tasman. The TTBC has also overseen the development of a Memorandum of Cooperation on Trans‑Tasman Bank Distress Management, which sets out arrangements for handling the potential failure of a trans‑Tasman bank.

=== Impact of Basel Accords ===
Australia has implemented Basel III through the Australian Prudential Regulation Authority (APRA), which is responsible for setting prudential standards for authorised deposit‑taking institutions. APRA has generally adopted a conservative approach, applying requirements that are stricter than the minimum standards set by the Basel Committee on Banking Supervision.

Under Basel II and Basel III, Australian banks were required to hold higher levels of Common Equity Tier 1 capital and to meet new liquidity and funding standards. The Liquidity Coverage Ratio was introduced in 2015, supported by a Committed Liquidity Facility provided by the Reserve Bank of Australia until 2022, when increased government bond issuance allowed banks to meet the standard without central bank support.

The implementation of the Net Stable Funding Ratio in 2018 reduced reliance on short‑term wholesale funding, a vulnerability exposed during the 2008 financial crisis. APRA also required the four major banks to hold additional capital buffers reflecting their systemic importance.

The adoption of Basel 3.1 reforms, scheduled for full effect in 2026, is expected to increase capital requirements for residential mortgage lending and small business exposures. While these measures are intended to enhance financial stability, they have also contributed to tighter lending standards and lower returns on equity for Australian banks.

== History ==
=== Early history ===
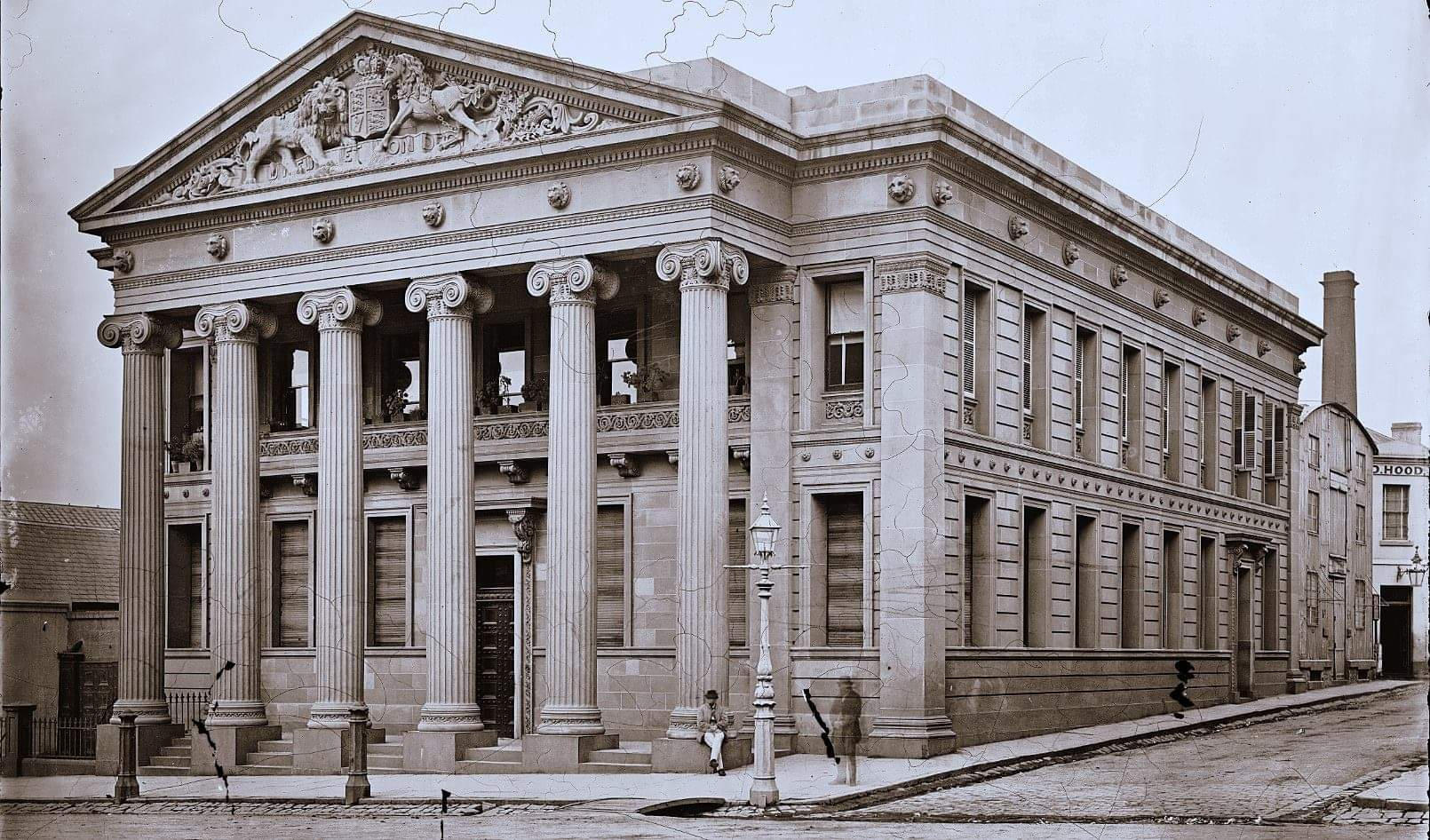
Oriental Bank, one of Australia's earliest bank buildings, located in Melbourne, circa 1870s. The bank went out of business in around 1884 and was demolished shortly afterwards.

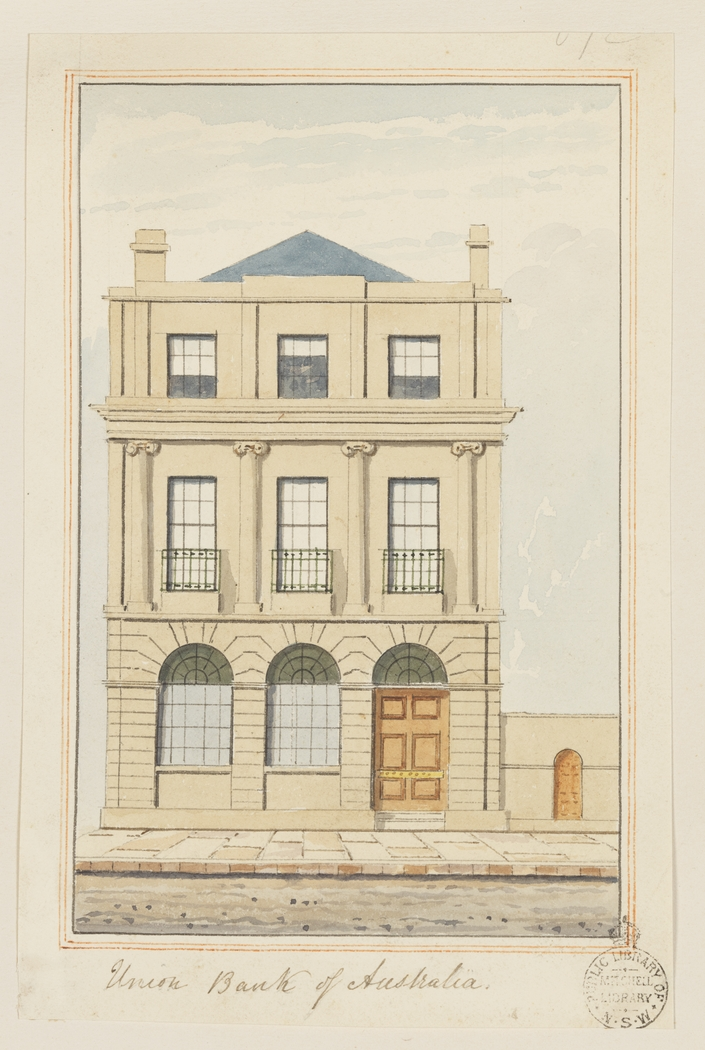
Bank of Australia, Sydney, 1840s

Between white settlement in Sydney in 1788 and 1817, there were no banks nor much currency in the colony. The first bank in Australia was the Bank of New South Wales, established in Sydney in 1817. During the 19th and early 20th century, the Bank of New South Wales opened branches throughout Australia and Oceania: at Moreton Bay (Brisbane) (in 1850), then in Victoria (1851), New Zealand (1861), South Australia (1877), Western Australia (1883), Fiji (1901), Papua (now part of Papua New Guinea) (1910) and Tasmania (1910). It was by far the most dominant bank throughout Australia until into the 1960s.

The Commercial Banking Company of Sydney was established in 1834, and the National Bank of Australasia established in Melbourne in 1858, and set up branches in other Australian colonies: Tasmania (in 1859), Western Australia (1866), New South Wales (1885) and Queensland (1920), and a London branch (1864). After acquiring a number of other banks over the years, these two banks merged in 1982 to form the National Commercial Banking Corporation of Australia, which was renamed the National Australia Bank.

In 1835 a London-based bank called the Bank of Australasia was formed that would eventually become the ANZ Bank. In 1951, it merged with the Union Bank of Australia, another London-based bank, which had been formed in 1837. In 1970, it merged with the English, Scottish and Australian Bank Limited, another London-based bank, formed in 1852, in what was then the largest merger in Australian banking history, to form the Australia and New Zealand Banking Group Limited.

A speculative boom in the Australian property market in the 1880s led to the Australian banking crisis of 1893. This was in an environment where little government control or regulation of banks had been established and led to the failure of 11 commercial banks, even the National Bank of Australasia.

Until 1910, banks could issue private bank notes, except in Queensland which issued treasury notes (1866–1869) and banknotes (1893–1910) which were legal tender in Queensland. Private bank notes were not legal tender except for a brief period in 1893 in New South Wales. There were, however, some restrictions on their issue or other provisions for the protection of the public. Queensland treasury notes were legal tender in that state.

=== After federation ===
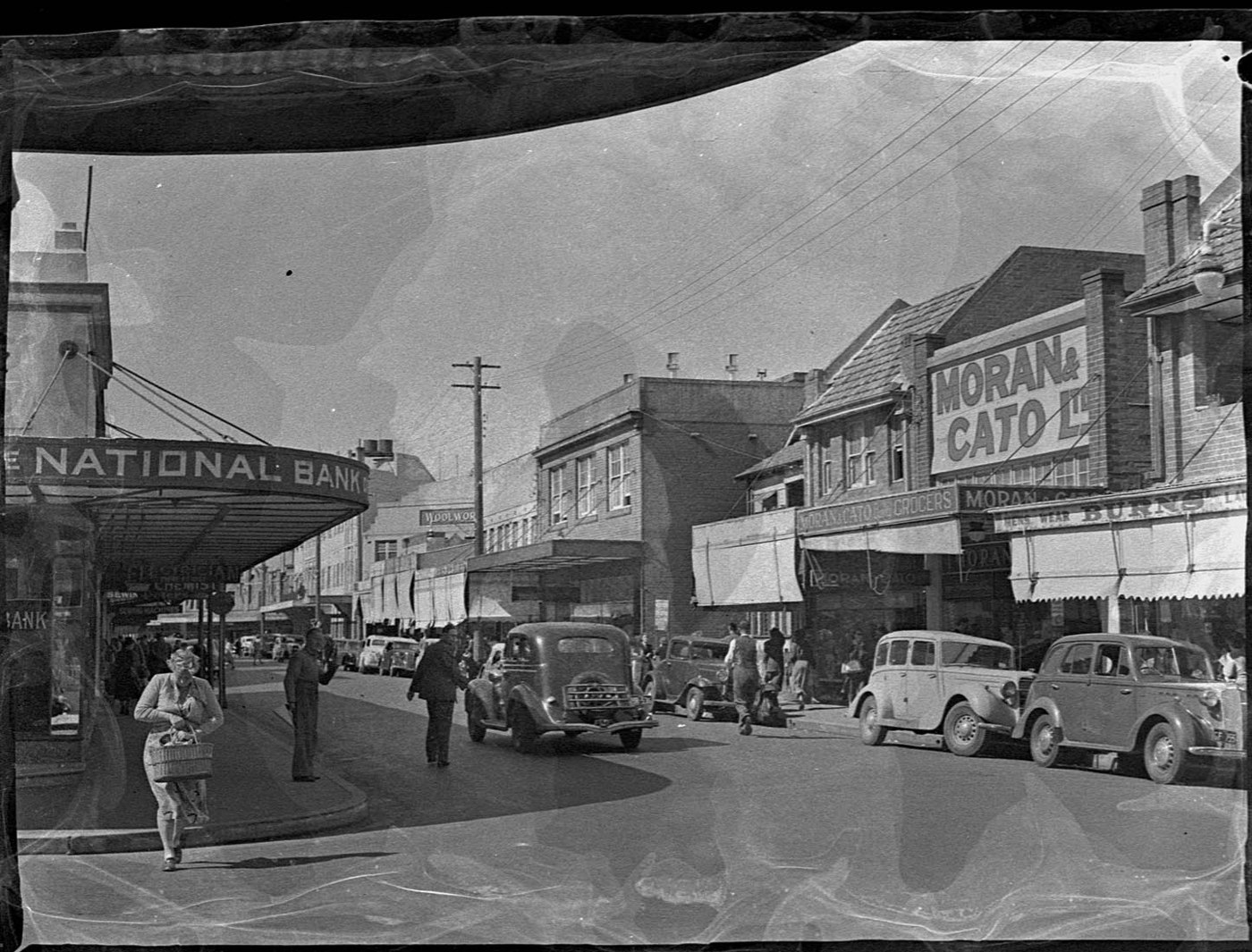
Nos 5 and 7 Sydney Road Manly in 1951, taken by Sam Hood for LJ Hooker, SLNSW 31789

1969 ABC news report on the introduction of ATMs in Sydney. People could only receive $25 at a time and the bank card was sent back to the user at a later date.

Private bank notes and treasury notes continued in circulation until 1910, when the federal Parliament passed the Australian Notes Act 1910 which prohibited the circulation of state notes as money and the Bank Notes Tax Act 1910 imposed a prohibitive tax of 10% per annum on 'all bank notes issued or re-issued by any bank in the Commonwealth ... and not redeemed'. These Acts put an end to the issue of notes by the trading banks and the Queensland Treasury. Also in 1910, the Australian pound was first issued as the legal tender in Australia. Now, the Reserve Bank Act 1959 expressly prohibits persons from issuing bills or notes payable to bearer on demand and intended for circulation.

The federal government established the Commonwealth Bank in 1911, which by 1913 had branches in all six states. In 1912, it took over the State Savings Bank of Tasmania (est. 1902) and did the same in 1920 with the Queensland Government Savings Bank (est. 1861). As with many other countries, the Great Depression of the 1930s brought a string of bank failures. In 1931, Commonwealth Bank took over two faltering state savings banks: the Government Savings Bank of New South Wales (est. 1871) and the State Savings Bank of Western Australia (est. 1863). In 1991, it also took over the failing State Bank of Victoria (est. 1842).

As a response to the Great Depression, banking in Australia became tightly regulated. Until the 1980s, it was virtually impossible for a foreign bank to establish branches in Australia; with the consequence that Australia had fewer banks compared to countries such as the United States and Hong Kong. Moreover, banks in Australia were classified as either savings banks or trading banks. Savings banks paid virtually no interest to their depositors and their lending activities were restricted to providing mortgages. Many of these savings banks were owned by state governments. Trading banks were essentially merchant banks, which did not provide services to the general public. Because of these and numerous other regulatory restrictions, other forms of non-bank financial institutions flourished in Australia, such as building societies and credit unions. These were regulated by state laws and were subject to less stringent regulations, could provide and charge higher interest rates, but were restricted in the range of services they could offer. Above all, they were not allowed to call themselves "banks".

From 1920, the Commonwealth Bank performed some central bank functions, which were greatly expanded during World War II. This arrangement caused some discomfort for the other banks, and as a result the Reserve Bank of Australia was created on 14 January 1960 and assumed the central bank functions previously performed by the Commonwealth Bank, including managing the currency, the money supply and exchange control.

=== Adoption of new technology ===
The rollout of automated teller machines (ATMs) commenced in 1969. There are a multiple ATM networks operating in Australia, the largest five are: the Commonwealth Bank-Bankwest network (with over 4,000 machines), NAB-rediATM network (with over 3,400 machines), Westpac-St George-BankSA and Bank of Melbourne network (with over 3,000 machines), ANZ (with over 2,600 machines) and Suncorp (with over 2,000 machines), and others. Financial institutions are linked via interbank networks.

The use of the Bank State Branch (BSB) identifier was introduced in the early 1970s with the introduction of MICR on cheques to mechanise the process of data capture by the banks as well as for mechanical sorting and bundling of physical cheques for forwarding to the payer bank branch for final cheque clearance.

EFTPOS technology was introduced in 1984. Initially, only the banks' existing debit and credit cards could be used, but in 1985, the ATM (Financial) Network was created to link EFTPOS systems to provide access for all customers. Cards issued by all banks could then be used at all EFTPOS terminals nationally, but debit cards issued in other countries could not. Prior to 1986, the Australian banks organized a widespread uniform credit card, called Bankcard, which had been in existence since 1974. There was a dispute between the banks whether Bankcard (or credit cards in general) should be permitted into the proposed EFTPOS system. At that time several banks were actively promoting MasterCard and Visa credit cards. Store cards and proprietary cards, such as fuel cards and Bartercard, were shut out of the new system, though they use compatible technology.

The widespread acceptance of credit cards and the development of SSL encrypted technology in mid 1990s opened the way to E-commerce. Telephone banking was introduced in the 1990s, with internet banking being introduced after 1995 and mobile banking after the 2010s. Bain, Research Now and Bain along with GMI NPS surveys in 2012 found that 27% of Australians have had mobile banking transactions in the previous three months. These innovations have resulted in significant shifts in banking in Australia away from the use of bank branches, and resulting in branch closures and staff cuts.

=== Deregulation and concentration ===
The banking industry was slowly deregulated. In the mid-1960s, the distinction between and separation of trading and savings banks was removed and all banks were allowed to operate in the money market (traditionally the domain of merchant banks), and banks were allowed to set their own interest rates. Building societies were allowed to take deposits from the public. Foreign exchange controls were abolished and the Australian dollar was permitted to float from December 1983.

Banking in Australia is notable by the small number of large banks in the market. Much of this concentration is the result of bank acquisitions. English, Scottish and Australian Bank was acquired by the ANZ Bank in 1970. In 1982, Bank of New South Wales merged with the Commercial Bank of Australia to form Westpac. There were many other bank mergers and acquisitions throughout Australia's banking history. The boom and bust of the 1980s was a turbulent period for banks, with some establishing leading market positions, while others being absorbed by the larger banks. Beginning in the 1980s, several building societies sought to convert to banks, but were required to demutualise before they were permitted to do so. This included NSW Building Society, which became Advance Bank, St George, Suncorp, Metway Bank, Challenge Bank, Bank of Melbourne and Bendigo Bank. A change in regulations allowed building societies and credit unions to become banks without having to demutualise, and several including Heritage Bank have converted since 2011 while retaining their status and structure as mutual organisations.

In 1990, the government adopted the "four pillars policy" in relation to banking in Australia and announced that it would reject any mergers between the four big banks. The four pillars policy, however, has not prevented the four major banks from acquiring smaller competitors. In 2000, CBA acquired the Colonial group, which had emerged as a major bank–insurance combine in the 1990s, after the Colonial Mutual insurance group took over State Bank of NSW in 1994. The Commonwealth Bank also acquired the State Bank of Victoria in 1990 and Bankwest in 2008. Westpac acquired the Challenge Bank in 1995, Bank of Melbourne in 1997, and St George Bank in 2008.

The Australian government's direct ownership of banks ceased with the full privatisation of the Commonwealth Bank between 1991 and 1996. There was also increased competition from non-bank lenders, such as providers of securitised home loans. A category of authorised deposit-taking institution (ADI) was created for a corporation which is authorised under the Banking Act 1959 to take deposits from customers. The change formalised the right of non-bank financial institutions – such as building societies and credit unions – to accept deposits from non-members.

Following the Wallis Committee Report, the Australian Prudential Regulation Authority (APRA) was established on 1 July 1998 to take over from the RBA the oversight of ADI's and other financial institutions in Australia, e.g., banks, credit unions, building societies, friendly societies, general insurance and reinsurance companies, life insurance and most members of the superannuation industry. The Payments System Board (PSB) was also created, to maintain the safety and performance of the payments system.

At the time, consumer credit in Australia was primarily loaned in the form of installment sales credit. The arrival of hundreds of thousands of readily employable migrant workers under the post-war immigration scheme, coupled with intense competition amongst lenders, discouraged proper investigation into buyers. Concerns about the possibly inflationary impact of lending created the first finance companies in Australia.

In June 2017 the Treasurer, Hon Scott Morrison MP, initiated the Open Banking Review. Open Banking is to encourage more efficiency in the market, create new opportunities for market entrants, encourage competition and give customers greater control over their data. This was finalised in March 2018.

In 2018 APRA created a restricted ADI framework. The framework is designed to encourage new entrants to the banking industry, particularly small firms with limited financial resources, to navigate the licensing process. Eligible entities can conduct a limited range of business activities for two years while they progress towards an unrestricted status. APRA announced and authorised the first restricted ADI, Volt Bank, on 7 May 2018. On 1 September 2022, APRA announced it had revoked Volt Bank Limited's (Volt) authorised deposit-taking institution (ADI) licence under the Banking Act 1959.

== Former government-owned Bank ==
- State Bank of Victoria (1842-1990)
- Bankwest (1895-1995)
- State Bank of South Australia (1896-1991)
- Commonwealth Bank (1911-1991)
- State Bank of New South Wales (1933-1994)
- Trust Bank of Tasmania (1991-1999)
- Queensland Government Savings Bank (1861-1920)

== See also ==
- Australian Banking Association
- Economy of Australia
- Financial system in Australia – Banking and borrowing in Australia
- List of banks in Australia
- Royal Commission into Misconduct in the Banking, Superannuation and Financial Services Industry – Australian royal commission into banking
- Timeline of banking in Western Australia
- Banking Code – Code Of Practice Between Banks
- Banking in New Zealand
