= P&N Bank =

Australian owned bank based in Perth

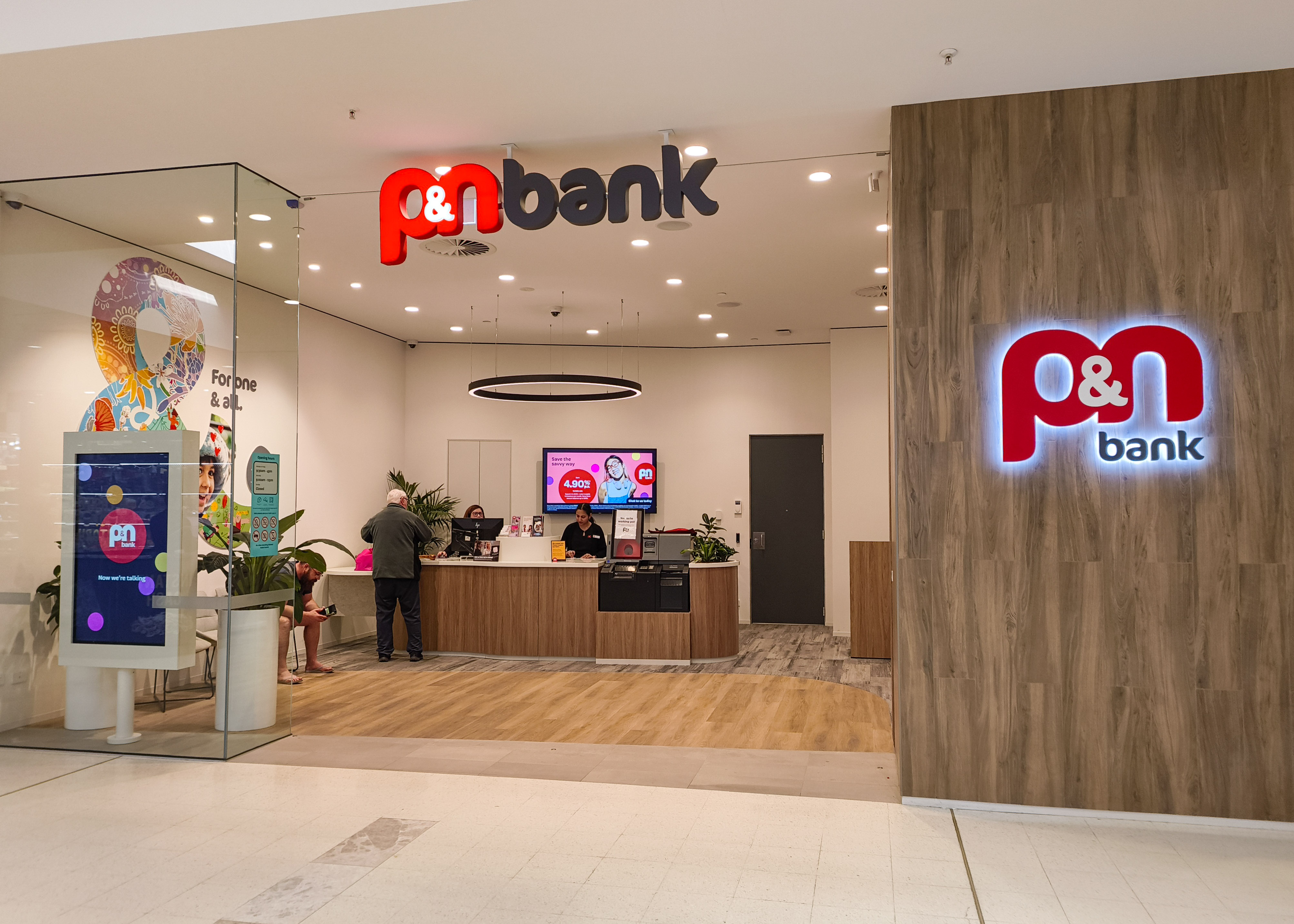
- P&N Bank branch in Westfield Carousel
- Native name: Police & Nurses Limited
- Company type: Mutual bank
- Industry: Banking
- Founded: 2013
- Headquarters: Perth, Australia
- Key people: Andrew Hadley (Chief Executive Officer); Stephen Targett (Chairman)
- Products: Retail banking Insurance; Home loans
- Website: pnbank.com.au

P&N Bank is a division of Police & Nurses Limited and is an Australian customer-owned bank based in Western Australia. Operating under a mutual model, P&N Bank provides retail banking services such as home loans, savings accounts, and insurance services. The bank has a network of branches throughout Perth and Bunbury.

As a customer-owned bank, there are no third-party shareholders. In May 2026, it was announced that P&N Group was exploring a potential merger with Bank Australia, another mutual bank, based in Victoria.

== History ==
Police & Nurses Credit Society originated in Western Australia in 1990 from the merger of the Police Credit Society of Western Australia Ltd and Western Australia Nurses Credit Society Ltd. In 2001, the organisation merged with Energy Credit Union Ltd, which was the amalgamation of a number of smaller WA credit unions, the oldest of which was established in 1949. About 15 former credit unions make up what is now P&N Bank.

- 1969: Western Australian Police Union Cooperative Credit Union Society Limited established
- 1972: WA Nurses Credit Society Limited established
- 1981: MTT Salaried Officers Association Credit Union merged with the Police Credit Society and membership was extended to members of the Army, Navy and Air Force
- 1990: Merger of the Police Credit Society and the Nurses Credit Society to Police & Nurses Credit Society
- 2001: Energy Credit Union merged into Police & Nurses Credit Society
- 2013: Police & Nurses Credit Society became a mutual bank trading as P&N Bank
- 2019: Bananacoast Community Credit Union based in Coffs Harbour became a division of Police & Nurses Limited, establishing a national multi-brand organisation with P&N Bank operating in Western Australia and BCU Bank operating in New South Wales and South East Queensland
- 2024: P&N Bank signed a Memorandum of understanding to investigate a potential merger with Beyond Bank Australia, it did not proceed
- 2025: P&N Group (Police & Nurses Limited) and Great Southern Bank signed a Memorandum of Understanding to explore a merger, aiming to create one of Australia’s largest customer-owned banks with combined assets of approximately $30 billion, a nationwide presence, and continued operation of all three brands—P&N Bank, BCU Bank, and Great Southern Bank—subject to due diligence, regulatory approvals, and a member vote expected in late 2026.
