= Thrift institution =

A thrift institution is a financial institution that obtains the majority of its funds from the savings of the public. The term can include several cooperative banking models;

- Savings and loan association
- Mutual savings bank
- Credit union
