= Credit Union Foundation Australia =

Australian not-for-profit organization

Cufa, formerly known as Credit Union Foundation Australia, is an independent, secular, not-for-profit Australian development organisation. Cufa has full accreditation under the Australian Aid program run by Department of Foreign Affairs and Trade (Australia) and is a signatory to the Australian Council for International Development Code of Conduct.

Cufa was founded in 1971 and delivers economic development, education, enterprise and employment projects across the Asia Pacific. Cufa has a head office in Sydney and offices in its countries of operations which include Bougainville, Cambodia, Fiji (serving the greater Pacific) Myanmar and East Timor.

== Vision ==
Cufa's vision is for communities of the Asia Pacific region to be free of poverty through economic development and self-determination.

== Mission ==
To facilitate the development of economic capacity through education, employment and enterprise opportunities to build community self-reliance.

== History ==
Cufa Ltd was created in 1971 as the development agency of the Australian Credit union Movement. Cufa was previously a subsidiary company of Customer Owned Banking Association (COBA), became an independent entity 1 July 2013, when Cufa Ltd became the holder of the two shares in Credit Union Foundation Australia Pty Ltd.

As a subsidiary company, Cufa's members were the members of the Australian credit union movement. As an independent entity, Cufa now has its own membership through Cufa Ltd. Cufa Ltd also has its own constitution.

== Current work ==
Cufa's focus is on promoting financial inclusion and increasing financial literacy and improving economic livelihoods. Cufa develops community access to affordable financial services working cooperatively from the grass-roots through to government levels, building capacity in emerging financial cooperative movements to create sustainability, improve lives, and relieve poverty.

=== Community-owned financial institutions ===
Cufa's Credit Union Outreach project is supporting existing community owned financial institutions in Cambodia and Timor-Leste to have improved sustainable financial management, governance and operational processes by providing tailored support and training programs.

Through tailored training the Project is assisting community owned financial institutions to help develop their operational practice across governance, savings and membership mobilisation, managing delinquency, roles and responsibilities of committee members, loan application practices, book keeping skills, micro-enterprises, dividend calculations and monthly interest allocations.

Cufa's Credit Union Development project helps to build, develop and promote community owned financial institutions in rural Cambodian and Timorese communities that previously had no access to financial services. The project works in collaboration with communities to establish community owned financial institutions based on the principles outlined by the International Credit Union Movement, codified by the World Council of Credit Unions (WOCCU).

=== Financial education ===
Cufa's financial education programs focus on teaching children and adults about having good money skills through an understanding on how to manage household expenses, savings and creating profitable micro-businesses.

=== Micro-business development ===
Cufa's Village Entrepreneur through financial, business and agricultural technical training assists villagers in rural Cambodia and Timor-Leste to start-up and expand micro-enterprises such as mobile grocery stalls, poultry and piggery farms, second-hand good collector businesses and carpenters.

=== Current developmentprojects ===
As of 2016, Cufa operates the following projects:

==== Bougainville ====
- "Rot Bilong Ol Yangpla Blo Bihain Taim" (Youth Pathways for the Future)

==== Cambodia ====
- Village Entrepreneur Initiative
- Reaching an Independent Economic Life (RIEL)
- Credit Union Development
- Credit Union Outreach
- Savings, Enterprise and Economic Development (SEED)
- Children's Financial Literacy

==== Fiji ====
- Oceania Confederation of Credit Union Leagues

==== Myanmar ====
- Credit Union Development
- Myanmar Teachers Project
- Village Entrepreneur

==== Timor-Leste ====
- Credit Union Development
- Village Entrepreneur

== Funding sources ==
Cufa receives funding from government institutions such as Australia's Department of Foreign Affairs and Trade (DFAT), donations from members of the Australian public and corporate supporters such as financial institutions and third-party suppliers.

Key partnerships include: the Teachers Mutual Bank, Bank First and QT Mutual Bank in support of the Myanmar Teachers' Project; and CPA Australia which sponsored the development of digital tablet applications to support children's financial literacy in Cambodia.

== Governing body ==
Cufa's board overseen by a Company Secretary consists of a Chair and five company directors and is responsible for the strategic direction and performance of the organisation. Ms Colette McInerney is the current Chair of the Board.

Since 2021, Darian Clark has led the organisation as Chief Executive Officer.
