= Allphones =

Australian telecommunications retailer

- Industry: Telecommunications
- Founded: 1989
- Founder: Brian Werner
- Defunct: 2017
- Website: https://www.allphones.com.au/

Allphones was an Australian telecommunications retailer which specialised in offering a wide range of mobile and broadband related services across a range of carriers. The Allphones name is now only used for an online store, which is operated by Australian retailer Mobileciti.

Allphones was started in 1989 with the first store in Mile End, South Australia. The company franchised a further 14 stores in South Australia before it was sold in 2000 by Brian and Helen Werner. There were also some sites in NSW like Westfield Parramatta and sponsored Sydney Super Dome from 1st September 2011 until 11 April 2016.

After the expulsion of its Virgin Mobile franchisee by litigant and franchisor Optus, ensuing massive losses, and pulling of funding by shareholder Skidmore in a short-lived fruitless turnaround, Allphones entered voluntary administration in February 2017, leading to the closure of 34 stores. Fortunately Skidmore filed for 6 deeds of company arrangement, and injected $23 million into the company to keep it afloat in the meantime or to pay entitlements to licensees and 446 employees, and allowed for the franchises to be taken to 'new operators', avoiding the liquidation of Allphones affecting the entire company and maximising the return for stakeholders and creditors.

The name Allphones still exists as an online megastore addressed to a post office in Westfield Parramatta.
