= Heritage Bank =

Australian banking company

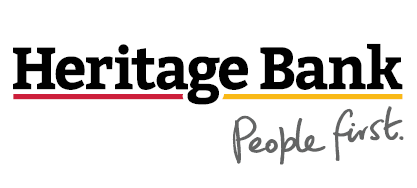
- Formerly: Toowoomba Permanent Building Society (1875) & Darling Downs Building Society(1897) (Merged in 1981) Rebranded as Heritage Building Society (Changed to Heritage Bank Limited in 2011)
- Company type: Bank (Mutual)
- Industry: Banking, financial services
- Founded: 1875 as Toowoomba Building Society
- Headquarters: Toowoomba, Queensland, Australia
- Key people: Peter Lock (CEO)
- Products: Banking: Deposit, investment, home and motor insurance, home loans, personal loans, car loans, credit cards, business finance, commercial insurance, business credit cards
- Revenue: ▲ A$404 million (2018)
- Total assets: $12.2 billion (2022)
- Members: 330,000 (2022)
- Number of employees: 900 (2022)

Heritage and People’s Choice Limited, trading as Heritage Bank, is one of Australia's largest mutual banks. Its head office is in Toowoomba, Queensland.

The bank has over 62 branches and mini-branches in southern Queensland and New South Wales and sells home loans via a network of mortgage brokers in every state and territory in Australia. The bank's customer contact centre is also based in Toowoomba, Queensland.

Heritage and People’s Choice Limited is a mutual organisation which is owned by its members, not by shareholders. Heritage is also a member of the Customer Owned Banking Association (COBA).

== History ==
The Toowoomba Permanent Building Society was formed in 1875 and 1893 recorded a record profit. In 1897 Darling Downs Building Society launched and by 1914 had become the largest building society in Queensland. Over the next 20 years, the two building societies continued to grow and alternated as the largest building society in Queensland.

In 1934, Toowoomba Permanent Building Society moved its head office from Russell Street to a site at the corner of Russell and Neil Streets, Toowoomba where it remained for 43 years. Darling Downs Building Society's head office was located nearby Margaret Street, Toowoomba (1954) before moving to Ruthven Street, Toowoomba in 1971.

In 1981, Toowoomba Permanent Building Society and Darling Downs Building Society merged to form the Heritage Building Society, and in 1983 the head office moved to the newly constructed Heritage Plaza at 400 Ruthven Street, Toowoomba where it still sits today. Assets of the Heritage Building Society passed the $1 billion mark in 1995, the $4 billion mark in 2003, the $7 billion mark in 2009, and exceeded the $10 billion mark in 2019.

The first community branch for Heritage opened in Crows Nest in 1999, with a further six branches opening over the coming years.

In 2011, the organisation changed its name to Heritage Bank.

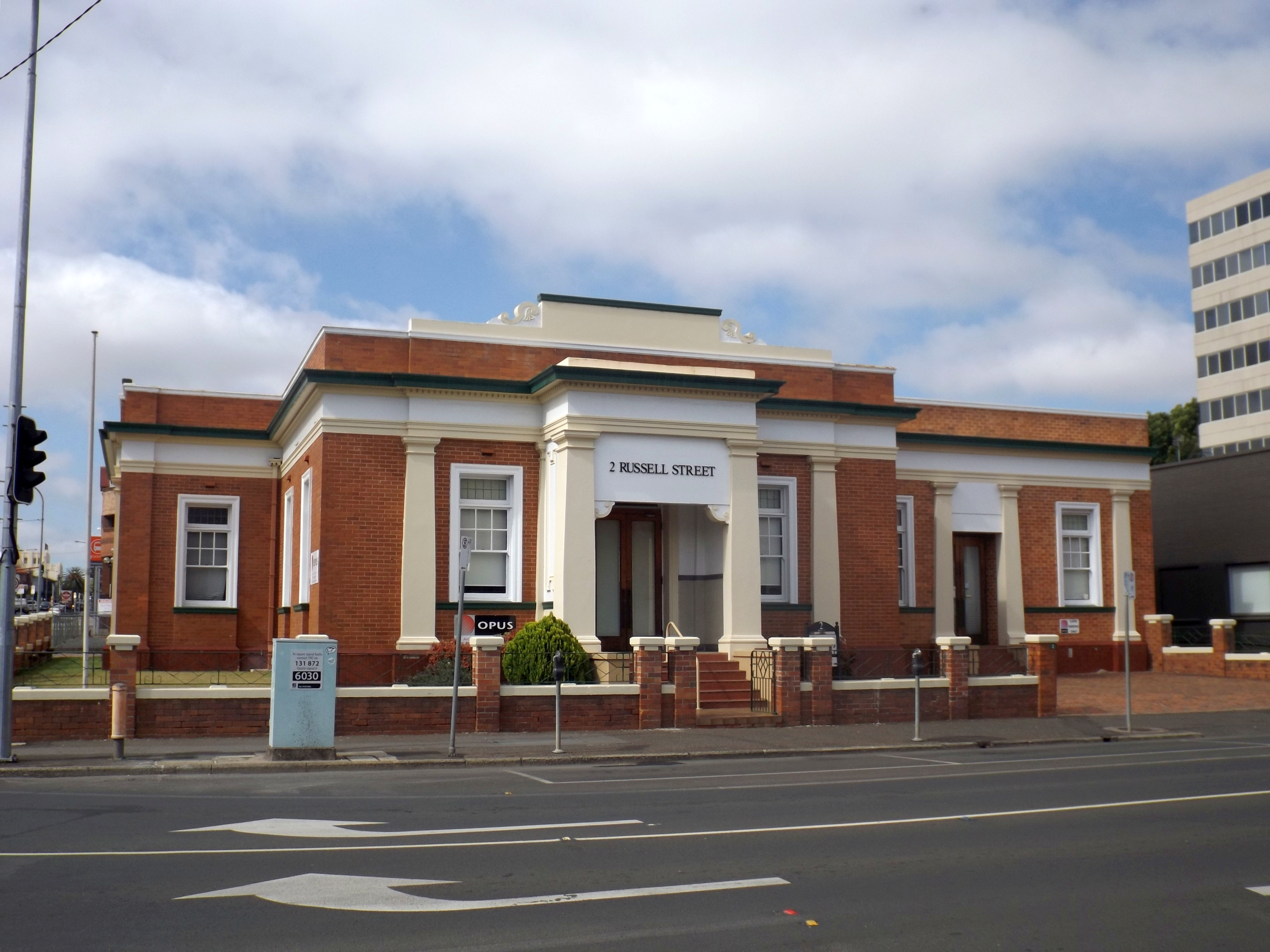
The original Head Office of the Toowoomba Permanent Building Society, located on Russell St, Toowoomba

In 2018, it was announced that Heritage would expand its branch operations outside of Queensland for the first time, and in October 2019 the first branch opened in Castle Hill, New South Wales. As a part of this expansion, the Heritage Bank logo was also updated to remove the stylised "gates" that were a part of the original logo.

In August 2021, Heritage Bank entered discussions with People's Choice Credit Union about a potential merger, and in April 2022 both companies announced that they planned to merge, subject to a vote of the membership. Members gave their approval on 16 November 2022.

The new combined organisation was named Heritage and People's Choice Ltd and operates under the banking licence held by People's Choice Credit Union.

Announced in November 2023, the new bank is called People First Bank.

== Headquarters ==
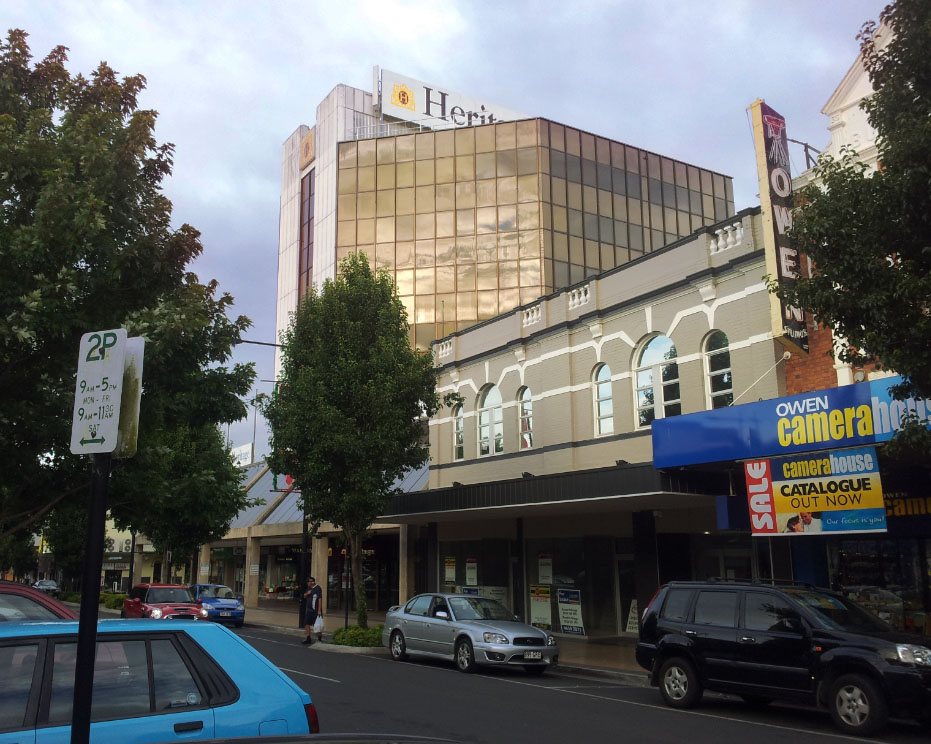
Heritage Plaza Tower is the current Head Office for Heritage Bank

Heritage Plaza Tower, built in 1983 at 400 Ruthven Street, Toowoomba, was the first high-rise office building in Toowoomba.

The building houses Heritage Bank's various departments and contact centre and has a branch on the ground floor. Heritage Plaza Tower is the workplace for approximately 400 Heritage staff.

== Products and services ==
Heritage provides retail, business, and agribusiness banking services as well as superannuation, general and commercial insurance products (through Allianz) and financial planning (through Bridges Financial Services).

=== Branch network ===
Heritage services its members through a variety of channels. One of the largest being its branch network, the Bank currently has over 50 locations in Queensland and New South Wales.

In January 2026, People First Bank announce that the following Queensland, branches will close at Millmerran, Oakey, Pittsworth, Toowoomba Range, Wilsonton, Hervey Bay, Kawana Waters, Kippa‑Ring, Coomera, Tweed Heads and Runaway Bay.

One branch will close in New South Wales at Macquarie Park, one in Victoria at Caroline Springs, and two in South Australia at Millicent and Blackwood.

Agency sites will also close at Laidley, Goondiwindi and Maryborough. These closures will take effect 4pm Thursday 12 March 2026

Previous branch closures were effective 4pm Friday 4 April 2025 included:

Heritage Bank: Beenleigh, Brookside, Capalaba, Indooroopilly, Noosa Civic, Nambour, Mermaid Waters, Nerang, Strathpine, The Pines Elanora and Victoria Point. People’s Choice: Seaford, Northpark, Victor Harbor, Gawler, Warrnambool, Maryvale and Darwin.

=== Heritage notes ===
In October 2009, Heritage was the first mutually Authorised Deposit-taking Institution (ADI) to initiate an ASX-listed debt transaction. Heritage raised $50 million from the issue of 500,000 subordinated, unsecured debt securities. The demand for Heritage notes was extremely strong and the transaction was three times oversubscribed. Heritage Notes are no longer available for sale.

=== Heritage Online (HOL) ===
Heritage Bank offers online banking services through Heritage Online. Heritage Online lets customers transfer funds, manage accounts, access assets and liabilities, and manage savings. Heritage Online is also offered with a mobile app.

=== Contact centre ===
Heritage's Contact Centre is based in Toowoomba, Queensland and in 2018 commenced operating 24 hours a day, 7 days a week.

== Cards and payments ==
=== Digital wallet ===
Heritage Bank offers several digital wallet options including; Samsung Pay, Garmin Pay, Fitbit Pay, Google Pay and Apple Pay.

=== Pre-paid cards ===
Heritage is the largest issuer of prepaid cards in Australia, particularly travel cards, working with several companies that sell pre-paid cards. Heritage currently supports brands including Australia Post, Optus, Qantas, Travelex, Afterpay and MasterCard's multi-currency CashPassport.

== Heritage Bank Charitable Foundation ==
In June 2019 Heritage Bank launched a registered charity dubbed the Heritage Bank Charitable Foundation with an initial $2 million contribution. The foundation provides funding grants to not-for-profit groups for projects aimed at building and improving community well-being and life outcomes for people.

== Sponsorships and community support ==
Heritage sponsors many organisations and events in Queensland, including the Heritage Bank Toowoomba Royal Show and Toowoomba Carnival of Flowers. In 2020, Heritage Bank became a sponsor of the leading food rescue organisation Ozharvest.

=== Community branches ===
Heritage currently has seven community branches located in Highfields, Crows Nest, Millmerran, Karalee, Forest Lake, Nanango and Palmwoods.

The community banking model is based on the formation of a community-based company made up of a range of investors from the immediate area where a branch is to be established. Heritage then partners with this company to form a joint venture. Joint venture company directors act in a voluntary capacity. Both Heritage and the company contribute to the set-up costs and share ongoing expenses.

Profits are shared and the company can distribute its share of profits back into the community to support charities, sporting clubs and other local organisations through grant funding.

=== Calendar House ===
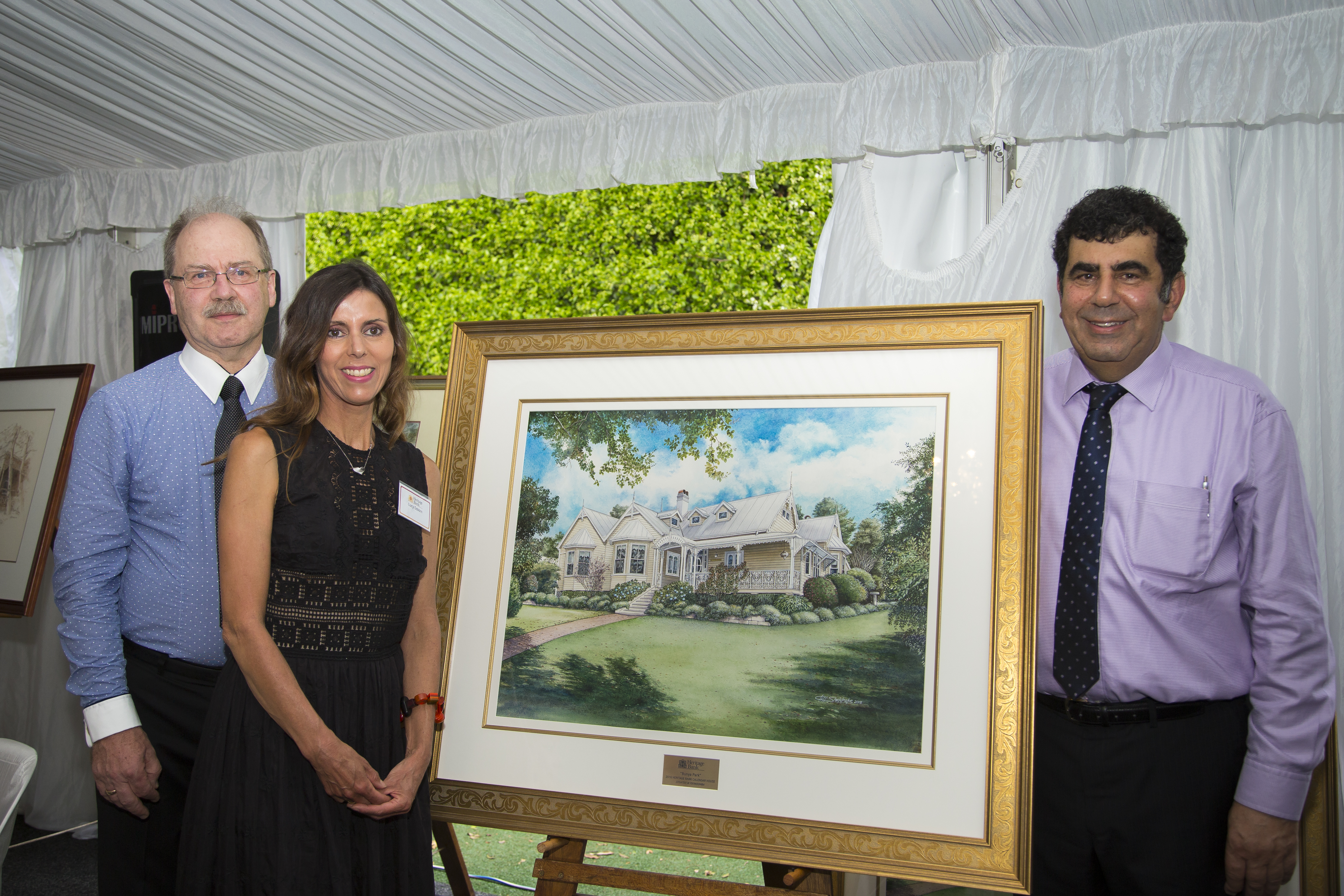
Kerry Betros (Heritage Bank Chairman) with Jeremy and Lucy Osborn (members) with 2015 Calendar House painting of Bunya Park

Every year, Heritage releases a calendar which features a painting of an architecturally and historically important house in Queensland. A brief history of the home is also included on the calendar. The aim is to recognise and celebrate the finest examples of excellence in Queensland's domestic architecture. The first edition of the calendar was released in 1982.

== Photographic awards ==
The Heritage Bank Photographic Awards are held annually, with the competition open to Australian residents. No background or experience in photography is required. Entries are accepted in two main categories. The first is the open category where the choice of subject is up to the photographer. The second is the themed category which changes annually, and entries are open to the photographer's interpretation of the theme. The Photographic Awards celebrated their 30th year in 2018.

== See also ==
- Banking in Australia
- List of banks
- List of banks in Australia
- List of banks in Oceania
