= Great Southern Bank =

Australian credit union bank

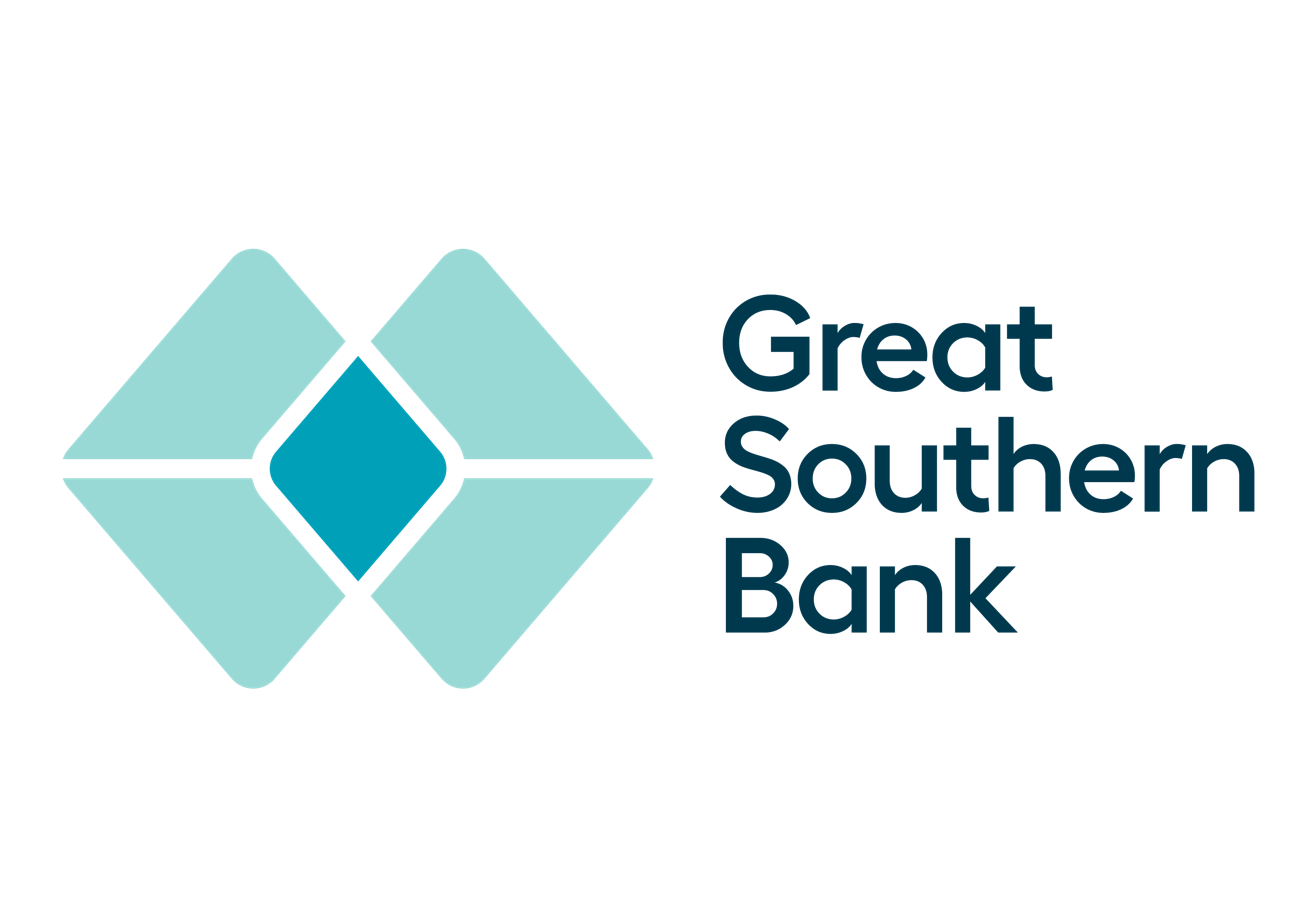
- Formerly: Credit Union Australia (1980–2021)
- Company type: Credit union, member-owned bank
- Industry: Banking, financial services
- Founded: 1946
- Headquarters: 300 George Street, Brisbane, Queensland
- Key people: Paul Lewis (CEO); Deborah O'Toole (Chairman)
- Products: Home Loans, Personal Loans, Credit Cards, Small Business Banking
- Revenue: $357 million (2023)
- Rating: Long term: BBB
- Website: www.greatsouthernbank.com.au

Great Southern Bank, formerly Credit Union Australia, is one of Australia's largest customer-owned banks with corporate offices in Brisbane, Sydney, and Melbourne. It provided banking services to more than 400,000 Australians in 2023.

== Overview ==
Great Southern Bank is a mutual bank with origins dating back to 1946. It has branches located around Australia, predominantly on the east coast. Great Southern Bank has an Australian-based contact centre in Melbourne. It is part of the Customer-owned Banking Association, the industry association for mutual banks, credit unions, and building societies, adhering to the association's Customer-owned Banking Code of Practice. It is also a member of the Business Council of Cooperatives & Mutuals (BCCM).

Formed via the merger of many smaller credit unions across Australia over time, the bank traded as Credit Union Australia for more than 40 years, before changing name to Great Southern Bank in June 2021.

== History ==
The earliest precursor to Great Southern Bank was officially founded in 1946. It was created through the amalgamation of several small Queensland based credit unions in the 1940s and had around 180 members in total. Since then, through the joining of more than 171 credit unions, it has become the biggest customer-owned bank in Australia.

=== Timeline ===
1946–1965	The origins of CUA can be traced back to a few small credit unions in the 1940s including the Catholic Thrift and Loan Co-op in 1946, the Thrift and Loan credit Union in 1948, and the postal Workers Co-op Credit Society in 1949.
1966–1975	After several mergers, in 1966 the Queensland Postal Cooperative (now CUA) was founded by staff of the General Post Office in Brisbane. The first loans were issued to a maximum value of $550. In 1968, the credit union's name was changed to the Australian Postal Credit Union and Jack Harvey, a Post Master, was appointed General Manager on a full-time basis. In 1975 members' accounts were fully computerised and term deposits were introduced.
1976–1992	In 1976 the credit union purchased a travel agency to provide discount travel to members. In 1977, full insurance was provided including CUA Health. In 1978, it introduced 24-hour ATM access for members. It was officially renamed Credit Union Australia in 1980 and had more than 30 branches. Various amalgamations continued and between 1978 and 1992, Credit Union Australia (CUA) continued to introduce new products and services including 24-hour ATMs, financial planning, housing loans and Visa cards.
1993–2006	Credit Union Australia rapidly expanded its presence into Victoria, New South Wales, the Australian Capital Territory and Western Australia through various mergers. In 1996, fixed home loans were introduced to offer members an alternative to variable rate home loans. Following its merger with Australian National Credit Union (ANCU), Credit Union Australia became the country's largest credit union by membership, staff numbers and assets. Credit Union Australia was named Credit Union of the Year for four consecutive years by the Australian Banking + Finance Awards.
2007–2010	In 2007 Credit Union Australia rebranded to CUA and merged with Victorian-based Plenty Community Credit Union in 2010 amassing more than 380,000 members, making it the biggest credit union in Australia. That same year the Federal Treasurer, Wayne Swan, credited CUA for bringing competition to Australian banking when it dropped its standard variable home loan by 25 basis points outside of any official rate movement. CUA was named Credit union of the Year at the Australian Banking + Finance Awards in 2010.
2011–2020	In 2012 CUA aimed to further differentiate itself from the Big Four banks by rolling out a number of new products. Alongside CUA Super and CUA Pension, it launched its CUA Rate Breaker Home Loan Package which offered a discounted one per cent lower interest rate than the average of the Big Four banks' variable rate. In 2013 the product won Best Innovator award from Australian Lending Awards 2013 and a 5-Star rating from CANSTAR. In 2012, the Youth e-Saver account was launched, an online transaction account designed specifically for 10 to 17 year-olds. In November 2013, CUA updated its whole core banking system to BaNCS costing around $60 million. In 2014, CUA won Best Non-Bank Lender and Best Mutual Lender at the Australian Lending Awards.
2021–2022	CUA is rebranded as a bank and changed its name to Great Southern Bank on its 75th anniversary. On 9 August 2021, Great Southern Bank announced that it was carbon neutral. On 16 November 2021, Great Southern Bank adopted a new constitution to elevate its commitment to mutuality and to provide a simpler constitution. On 14 February 2022, Great Southern Bank launched a 10-episode podcast series called The Clever Way Home, hosted by Sophie Tieman, with the aim of demystifying the home buying process and helping first-time buyers.

== Partnerships ==
- Principal partner – Brisbane Heat BBL and WBBL cricket teams
- Co-Major Partner – Carlton Football Club's AFL and AFLW teams
- Community Partner – Mission Australia
- Naming rights sponsor of Penrith Stadium from 2006 until 2010

== Recent recognition/awards ==
- Forbes – Worlds Best Banks 2022
- Canstar – Customer-Owned Institution of the Year winner 2022
- Canstar – Savings 2022

== See also ==
- Banking in Australia
- List of banks in Australia
