= People's Choice Credit Union =

Australian credit union

People’s Choice
- Trade name: People's Choice
- Type: Credit union
- Industry: Financial services
- Headquarters: Flinders Street, Adelaide, South Australia
- Area served: South Australia; Northern Territory; Victoria
- Key people: Michael Cameron, Chairman; Steve Laidlaw, Chief Executive Officer
- Products: Retail banking; Investments; Insurance; Financial planning
- Total assets: A$10.3 billion (2022)
- Members: 390,000 (2022)
- Number of employees: Approx. 900 (2022)
- Website: peoplefirstbank.com.au/

Heritage and People’s Choice Limited, trading as People's Choice, is an Australian credit union based in Adelaide, South Australia. It is one of Australia's largest credit unions, with branches located in South Australia, Northern Territory and Victoria, offering loans, credit cards, transaction and savings accounts, mortgages and insurance.

== History ==
People's Choice traces its origins to 1949 and since then has evolved through a number of mergers including with the Northern Territory Credit Union.

In August 2009, Australian Central Credit Union and Savings & Loans announced plans for a merger which was completed in December 2009. Savings and Loans Credit Union commenced in 1949 as the South Australian Public Service Savings and Loans Society. By the time of the merger with Australian Central Credit Union, Savings and Loans had merged with a number of smaller credit unions. Including, SAGASCO Employees' CU, Warwick Co-Operative CU and the SAATB CU. In 1992 regulations under the Credit Union Act required that the words "credit union" were present in the official title, a number of options including Premier, capital and Horizon were discussed, at a Special General Meeting in 1994 the name Savings and Loans Credit Union (SA) Ltd was approved. In 2005 Savings and Loans merged with the NSW NRMA Employees' Credit Union, and in 2008 Austral Credit Union merged with Savings and Loans Credit Union.

Members then voted to change the name of the new organisation to People's Choice Credit Union which was adopted on 18 July 2011.

In November 2014, People's Choice Credit Union acquired TIO's banking division from the Northern Territory Government, transferring accounts and deposits of approximately 8,000 customers to People's Choice.

In August 2021, People's Choice Credit Union entered into discussions with Heritage Bank about a potential merger, and in April 2022 both companies announced that they planned to merge. Members gave their approval on 16 November 2022.

The new combined organisation was named Heritage and People's Choice Ltd and operates under the banking licence held by People's Choice Credit Union. The merged organisation will remain member-owned and will continue to operate under the People’s Choice and Heritage brands for an interim period, before adopting a single new brand in 2024.

Announced in November 2023, the new bank is called People First Bank.

In January 2026, People First Bank announce that the following Queensland, branches will close at Millmerran, Oakey, Pittsworth, Toowoomba Range, Wilsonton, Hervey Bay, Kawana Waters, Kippa‑Ring, Coomera, Tweed Heads and Runaway Bay.

One branch will close in New South Wales at Macquarie Park, one in Victoria at Caroline Springs, and two in South Australia at Millicent and Blackwood.

Agency sites will also close at Laidley, Goondiwindi and Maryborough. These closures will take effect 4pm Thursday 12 March 2026

Previous branch closures were effective 4pm Friday 4 April 2025 included:

Heritage Bank: Beenleigh, Brookside, Capalaba, Indooroopilly, Noosa Civic, Nambour, Mermaid Waters, Nerang, Strathpine, The Pines Elanora and Victoria Point. People’s Choice: Seaford, Northpark, Victor Harbor, Gawler, Warrnambool, Maryvale and Darwin.

== Structure and regulation ==
Heritage and People’s Choice Limited is a mutual organisation, a member-owned structure where its customers are also shareholders.

=== Funding ===
People's Choice completed a $650 million offering of residential mortgage-backed securities (RMBS) in 2019. The offering was launched at $500 million but was extended to $650 million after receiving $1.4 million in bids. Light Trust 2019-1 was priced at 102 basis points above the one-month Bank Bill Swap Rate.

=== Awards ===
Forbes World’s Best Bank list 2024

== Indexing data ==
People's Choice has developed an index of housing affordability and liveability to help people looking to buy a house. The People's Choice of Housing analyses suburbs to determine whether a financial institution is likely to lend to a couple on ordinary income and expenses interested in a median-priced home in that suburb (serviceability), the cost of buying that home (affordability). It also provides a series of factors summarizing whether people are likely to want to live in that suburb (liveability).
