= Bank Australia =

Australian banking co-operative

- Formerly: CSIRO Co-operative Credit Society (1957–2015)
- Type: Customer-owned bank
- Industry: Retail banking; Investment banking; Insurance
- Founded: 1957
- Headquarters: Collingwood, Victoria, Australia
- Number of locations: 15 (2024)
- Area served: Australia
- Key people: Steve Ferguson (chair); Damien Walsh (managing director)
- Revenue: ▼ A$203.5 million (2024)
- Net income: ▼ A$26.8 million (2024)
- Total assets: ▲ A$11.7 billion (2024)
- Members: ▲192,261 (2024)
- Number of employees: ▲613 (2024)
- Website: www.bankaust.com.au

Bank Australia is an Australian customer-owned bank based in Collingwood, Victoria. The organisation can trace its origins back to 1957, when the CSIRO Co-operative Credit Society was formed. Over succeeding years, mergers among 72 other credit unions and co-operative banks eventually led to the creation of the Members & Education Credit Union (mecu) in 2003, which became Bankmecu in 2011, and Bank Australia in 2015.

Bank Australia is a member organisation of the Global Alliance for Banking on Values and is a certified B Corporation. As of 2024 it had 192,261 customer-members.

== History ==
The bank has its origins in the 19 September 1957 incorporation of the CSIRO (Commonwealth Scientific and Industrial Research Organisation) Co-operative Credit Society. Walter Ives was appointed as chairman, and the first 40 members, limited to officers and employees of CSIRO aged over 18, were admitted on 15 October.

At the end of 1966 the credit union had over 1770 members, and in that year Joel Belkin was appointed the first full-time general manager (which he held until 1981). In 1982 the society joined the Victorian Credit Co-operatives Association, the peak body for over 140 Victoria-based credit unions. In January 1986, the Canberra-based Laboratories Co-operative Credit Union Limited amalgamated with the CSIRO Co-operative Credit Society, and later that year rebranded as Sirocredit.

On 1 July 1998, Sirocredit merged with Enterprise Credit Union and Outlook Credit Union Co-operative to form Members Australia Credit Union Ltd and, in 2003, Members Australia Credit Union merged with the Education Credit Union (Ed Credit) to form the Members and Education Credit Union, styled as mecu.

In 2011, mecu began trading as Bankmecu, Australia's first customer-owned bank and, in 2015, it commenced trading as Bank Australia.

In 2019 Bank Australia switched to purchasing 100% renewable energy from its suppliers. It was the first bank in Australia to do so.

In June 2020, Bank Australia became a certified B Corp, that is, a for-profit corporation certified by B Lab for its social impact.

In April 2022, Bank Australia responded to shareholder demands and announced their Climate Action Strategy, setting a target to achieve net zero emissions by 2035. This included plans for reductions of their scope 3 emissions, and working with customers to help them reduce their emissions from electricity and gas use.

In 2024, Bank Australia announced plans to merge with Qudos Bank, claiming the new entity would be one of the largest customer-owned banks in the country, with 300,000 customers, total assets approaching $20 billion, and almost 900 employees. The merger was completed in mid-2025, with Bank Australia retaining the Qudos brand.

In November 2024, Australian Unity signed an agreement to sell its banking business to Bank Australia, with the deal completed in November 2025.

In May 2026, it was announced that Bank Australia was exploring a potential merger with P&N Bank, another mutual bank, based in Perth, Western Australia.

== Description ==
As of 2023 the bank had 186,863 customers (members).

=== Governance ===
As of February 2024, the bank is governed by a board chaired by Steve Ferguson. Damien Walsh is the managing director.

As of 2023 there were 591 employees.

=== Locations ===
The company's head office is in Collingwood, Victoria, and its National Contact Centre is located in Moe in the Latrobe Valley in Victoria. It has 10 branches, mostly in Victoria but also in Queensland, New South Wales, and Canberra.

=== Products and services ===
Bank Australia offers banking products including everyday banking, savings, term deposits, personal and car loans, home loans, credit cards and commercial banking services.

It operates digital banking services through internet and mobile app banking. Customers also have access to services such as Apple Pay and Google Pay, and fee-free withdrawals at Bank Australia ATMs as well as all major banks' ATMs.

As an authorised deposit-taking institution, Bank Australia is covered under the Financial Claims Scheme. Like all other authorised institutions, balances of up to A$250,000 are guaranteed by the Australian Government should Bank Australia collapse.

== Memberships, certifications and values ==
Bank Australia is a member organisation of the Australian Banking Association, the Global Alliance for Banking on Values (the first Australian bank to join), and is a certified B Corporation. It is also a member of RE100, a global business initiative on 100% renewable energy.

Bank Australia has been carbon neutral since 2011 and in 2018 became certified carbon neutral by the Australian Government's National Carbon Offset Standard (now Climate Active).

Bank Australia has stated that it has never invested and will never invest money in fossil fuels, live animal exports, military weaponry, tobacco or gambling.

=== Bank Australia Conservation Reserve ===
The Bank Australia Conservation Reserve is a 2,117-hectare (5,230-acre) private land reserve owned by the bank and its customers. The reserve, made up of four properties, is located in Victoria's Wimmera region and is protected from development forever through a conservation covenant. The company purchased the first of the properties in 2008 in response to customer concerns about the environment. Greening Australia manages the reserve alongside the non-profit Trust for Nature. In 2018, Bank Australia, in partnership with Greening Australia and Trust for Nature, won the Banksia Large Business Award for the conservation reserve's ten-year strategy.

=== Car loan financing ===
In August 2022, Bank Australia's chief impact officer, Sasha Courville, announced that Bank Australia would cease funding car loans for new fossil fuel (internal combustion engine) vehicles from 2025, as part of its commitment to achieve net zero carbon emissions by 2035.

=== Impact fund ===
Bank Australia allocates 4% of its after tax profits to the Bank Australia Impact Fund. The fund supports projects and partnerships that "benefit people, communities and the planet". As part of the fund, the bank runs an annual customer grants program, many concerned with investment in sustainability and community renewable energy projects.

== Reconciliation and Indigenous partnerships ==
In 2010, Bank Australia became the first customer-owned bank to launch a Reconciliation Action Plan. In 2023, as part of its commitment to reconciliation in Australia, it launched its First Nations Recognition and Respect Strategy 2023–2030.

As of 2024 Bank Australia has partnerships with First Nations organisations such as Seed Mob, Barengi Gadjin Land Council, Supply Nation, and the First Peoples' Assembly of Victoria. It also aims to grow lending for enterprises such as Caring for Country, and is establishing a First Nations Leadership Group.

== Domain name dispute ==
Bank Australia launched a domain name dispute on 21 January 2016 for the domain names bankaus.com.au and bankaustralia.com.au. In a single-member judgement on behalf of the WIPO Arbitration and Mediation Center, the claim was denied. Since the domain names in question were registered in 2011 and 2008 respectively, and the name "Bank Australia" was registered only in 2014, there was no evidence that the owner of the domain names had registered them to "prevent the owner of a name, trademark or service mark from reflecting the mark in a corresponding domain name" (cybersquatting) or "primarily for the purpose of disrupting the business or activities of another person".
