= Sydney SuperDome =

Multipurpose arena in Sydney, Australia

Sydney SuperDome Afterpay Arena

- Exterior Signage of Afterpay Arena (Olympic Boulevard) October 2026.
- Interactive map of Sydney SuperDome; Afterpay Arena
- Former names: Qudos Bank Arena (2016–2026); Allphones Arena (2011–2016); Acer Arena (2006–2011); Sydney SuperDome (1999–2006)
- Address: 19 Edwin Flack Avenue, Sydney Olympic Park; Sydney; New South Wales, Australia
- Location: Sydney Olympic Park, New South Wales, Australia
- Coordinates: 33°51′S 151°04′E
- Owner: TEG Live
- Operator: Legends Global
- Capacity: 18,000; 21,032 (with floor seats)
- Public transit: Sydney Olympic Park railway station

Construction
- Groundbreaking: September 1997
- Opened: 6 November 1999; 27 years ago
- Cost: $200 million
- Architects: Cox Architecture; Yaeger Architecture
- Structural engineer: Taylor Thomson Whitting
- Services engineer: Norman Disney & Young
- General contractor: Obayashi Corporation
- Main contractor: Abigroup

Tenants
- Sydney Kings (NBL) (1999–2002, 2016–present); Sydney Swifts (CBT) (2001–08); New South Wales Swifts (ANZ/NNL) (2008–2019); Giants Netball (NNL) (2017–2019)

Website
- www.afterpayarena.com.au/

The Sydney SuperDome, currently known as the Afterpay Arena under a naming rights deal, is a multipurpose arena in Sydney Olympic Park, New South Wales, Australia. It was completed in 1999 as part of the facilities for the 2000 Summer Olympics.

== History ==
The Sydney SuperDome was designed by Cox Architecture and Yaeger Architecture, and constructed and financed by Abigroup and Obayashi Corporation under a BOOT deal. It was opened by Premier of New South Wales Bob Carr in November 1999 with the first event being a performance by Luciano Pavarotti. In 2004, the management rights until 2031 were sold to Publishing & Broadcasting Limited. The use of the Superdome name was subject to a trade mark dispute with the New Orleans Superdome.

The development of the stadium was part of three subsites which also included a 3,400-space carpark which cost $25 million, and a plaza with external works, also costing $25 million. The roof's masts reach 42 metres (138 ft) above ground level, and the stadium occupies a site of 20,000 m^{2} (220,000 sq ft; 4.9 acres).

The venue is currently managed by Legends Global. The arena has a total capacity of 21,032 with a seating capacity of around 18,000, making the SuperDome the largest permanent indoor sports and entertainment venue in Australia.

The arena was known as the Sydney SuperDome from opening in 1999 until 11 May 2006, when it was renamed Acer Arena in a naming rights deal. The naming rights were subsequently purchased by Allphones from 1 September 2011. From 11 April 2016 to 30 June 2026, the venue was known as Qudos Bank Arena.

On 20 May 2026, it was announced that it will be renamed to Afterpay Arena as part of a new five-year naming rights deal, which began in July.

== Design ==
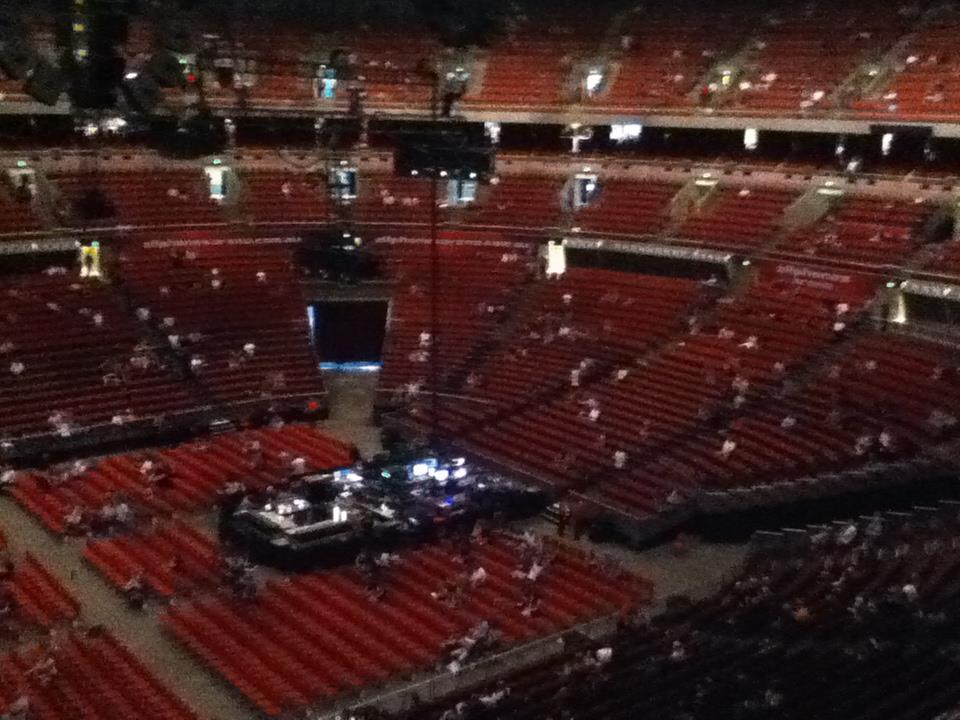
Interior view of the Sydney SuperDome, in concert configuration. Various seating configurations, such as the minor extension of the stand seen here, allow the venue to host up to 21,000 spectators seated.

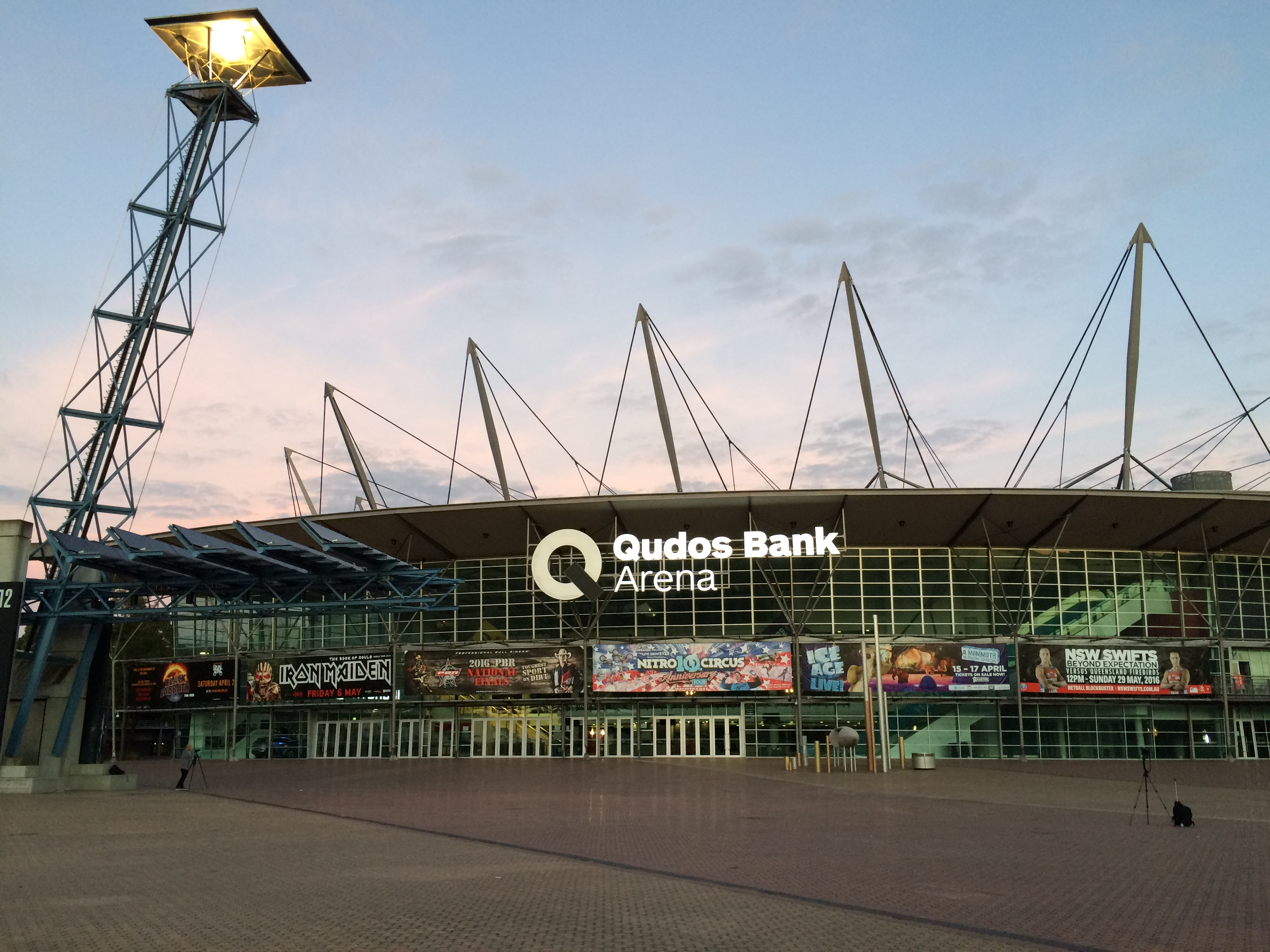
Exterior of Afterpay Arena (with old signage) in April 2016

The Sydney SuperDome is designed at an average capacity of 18,000 seated, with a maximum possible capacity of 21,032. The SuperDome's bowl is rearrangeable in various modes to accommodate for sports events, concerts, and the like, and the venue's capacity fluctuates depending on the event hosted. The floor of the venue measures 48 m (157 ft) by 78 m (256 ft) at its maximum extent. The venue is created from 5,696m^{3} of concrete, 1,884 tonnes of reinforcing steel, and is topped with a 1,235 tonne roof structure. 18 steel masts suspend from the zinc and aluminium-composed and alloy-coated steel roof, which is tensioned by cables stretching from the top of each mast to the center of the roof. The interior ceiling of the venue is decorated in a corrugated steel profile, heavily insulated with materials such as numerous copies of unused Yellow pages telephone directories.

Various measures were made at the request of the Sydney Organising Committee for the Olympic Games for environmentally friendly design measures. In its early years, the Sydney SuperDome used renewable energy for a fraction of its power supply, provided by EnergyAustralia's green power scheme. The venue saw use of green power through a deal with EnergyAustralia that lasted the duration of the 2000 Summer Olympics and the five years following. The SuperDome's power architecture includes 1,176 photovoltaic solar panels, installed on the arena's roof, which provide 10% of the venue's daily energy consumption, estimated at ~8612MWh annually. Energy efficient lighting and heating/cooling systems were also installed in the venue. The roof's drainage system consists of over 2000m of high-density polyethylene pipes, in addition to nearly 3000m of cast iron and copper pipes used in the venue's plumbing system, and 1000m of vitrified clay pipes that make up the SuperDome's surrounding stormwater drainage system. The SuperDome was also one of many venues built at Sydney Olympic Park that made use of recycled timber, used to construct the exterior balconies of the venue. The timber was sourced from Kempsey, and Oberon, along with local sources in Sydney. Additionally, polypropylene seats with nylon arms and mountings make up the SuperDome's stands. A disagreement over the construction of the roof resulted in lead contractor Abigroup terminating the contract of ABB.

== Events ==
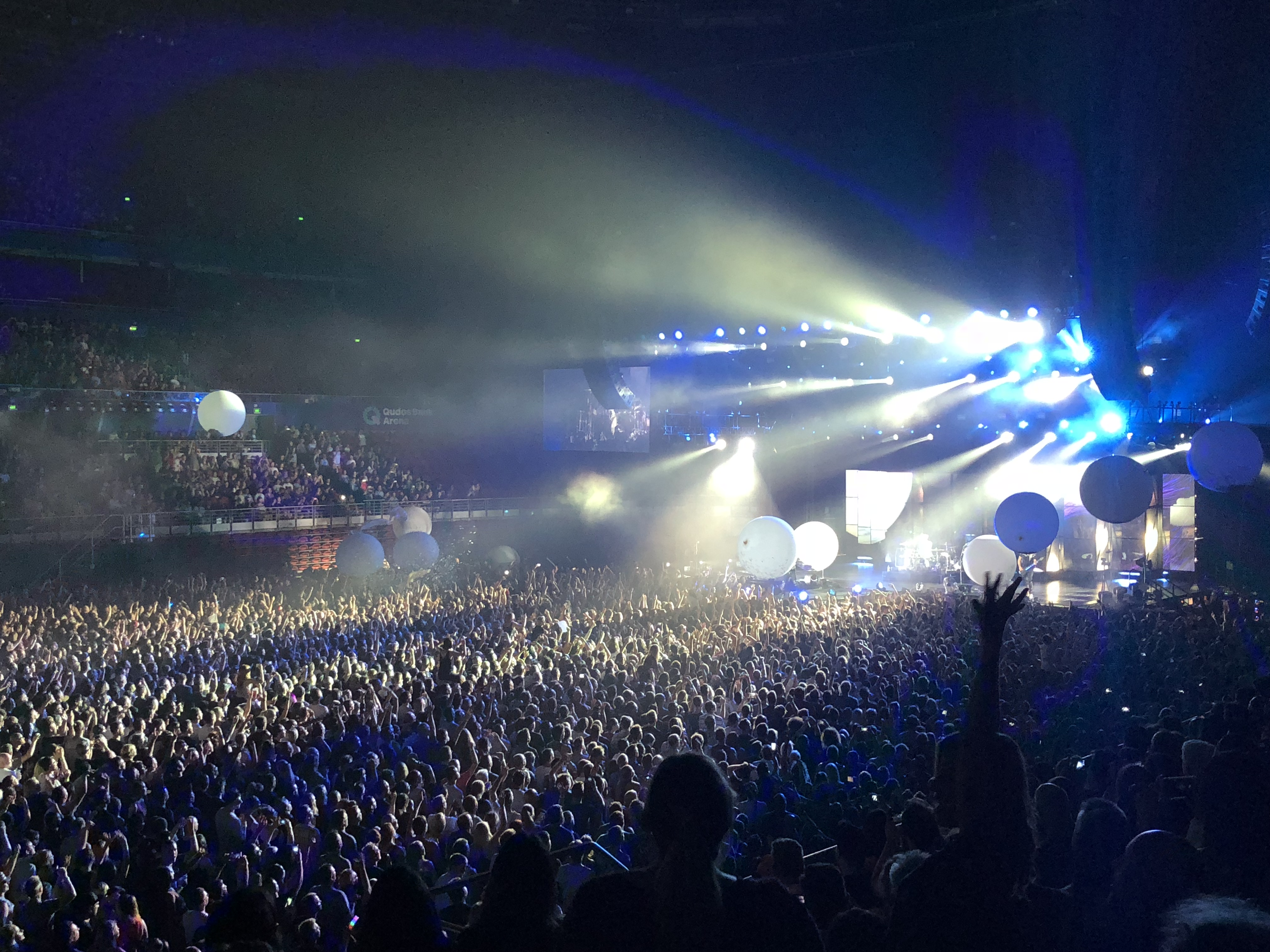
Sydney SuperDome at full capacity during a Muse concert in December 2017

The arena is home to many major entertainment and conference events and is a venue of choice for major entertainment promoters.

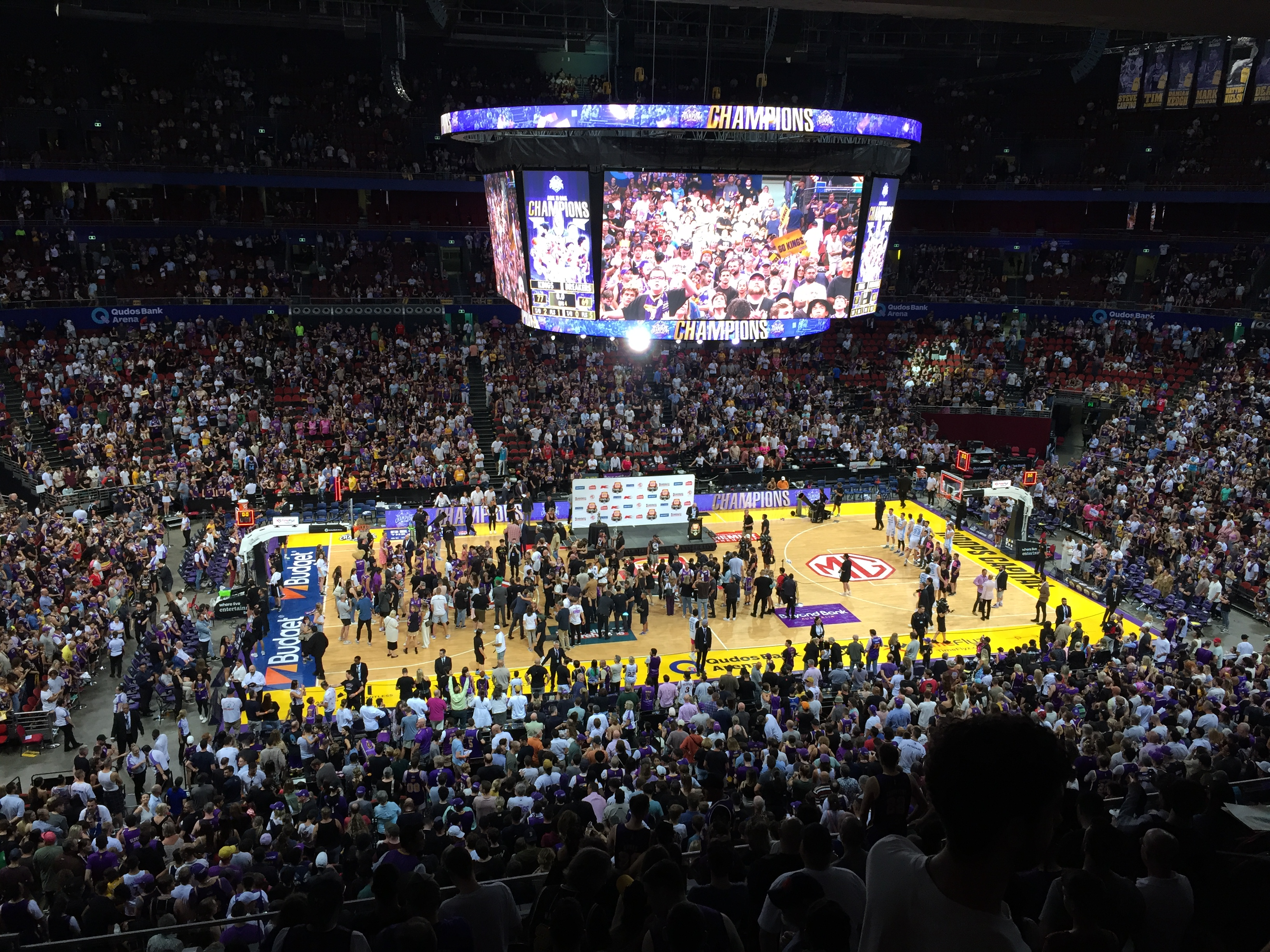
A Sydney Kings match in March 2023

- Hillsong Conference (2001–2010, 2012–2019)
- ARIA Music Awards (2002–2009, 2011)
- Sydney Kings Home Venue (1999–2002, 2016–present)
- NSW Schools Spectacular (2016–present)
- Intel Extreme Masters Sydney (2017–2019)

=== Notable events ===
On 11 December 1999, a league record 17,803 spectators attended a NBL match between the Sydney Kings and West Sydney Razorbacks. The record has since been eclipsed twice by Kings games at the Superdome. On 10 March 2023 18,049 fans watched the Sydney Kings defeat the New Zealand Breakers in Game 3 of the 2023 NBL Grand Final series. Just five days later the current record of 18,124 attended the deciding Game 5 of the series where the Kings defeated the Breakers to win the Championship.

During the 2000 Olympic Games, the venue hosted the men's and women's basketball finals, and the artistic and trampoline gymnastics events. In the men's basketball, the Bronze medal playoff won by Lithuania 89-71 over host nation Australia, and the Gold Medal playoff, won by the United States 85-75 over France, drew 14,833 fans to the arena. The permanent seating capacity of the SuperDome was reduced to approximately 15,500 during the Olympics due to the usual large number of seats allocated for the media.

In 2001, the SuperDome was the host of the ATP World Tour Finals Tennis Masters Cup won by Australian World number one men's tennis player Lleyton Hewitt, defeating Frenchman Sébastien Grosjean in the Final 6–3, 6–3, 6–4.

On 13 November 2004, the SuperDome attracted the record attendance for a netball game in Australia when 14,339 turned out to see the Australian Netball Diamonds defeat the New Zealand Silver Ferns, 54–49.

On 28 July 2008, an ANZ Championship-record 12,999 fans saw the New South Wales Swifts defeat the Waikato Bay of Plenty Magic, 65–56, in the ANZ Championship Grand Final at the Acer Arena.

On 3 July 2009, Taiwanese pop singer Jay Chou came to Sydney as part of The World Tour. It became the number one box office record holder for Allphones Arena, and has stayed in this position ever since. In that concert he broke 11 records in Australia including largest audience (15,200), highest total sponsored amount and highest production cost ($480 000). The box office reached US$2.6 million, out-grossing Beyoncé and The Eagles placing him at rank 2 worldwide.

On 17 November 2014, Narendra Modi, Prime Minister of India, addressed Indians residing in Australia.

Matches of the 2015 Netball World Cup were held at Allphones Arena, and the world record for a netball match was broken three times. Day 3 of the World Cup attracted 16,233 spectators. Day 9 attracted 16,244 while the Final held on 16 August 2015 attracted a netball world record attendance of 16,752 to see Australia defeat New Zealand 58–55 to win their third straight INF Netball World Cup and their 11th overall.

In November–December 2014, American singer-songwriter Katy Perry performed at the arena as part of The Prismatic World Tour, breaking the Allphones Arena ticket record with 89,500 patrons over six shows.

On 7 April 2019, Chinese singer-songwriter Joker Xue headlined the arena as part of his Skyscraper World Tour. Following his show, he became the first Chinese male artist to headline Melbourne Convention & Exhibition Centre, The Trusts Arena, and Qudos Bank Arena. He returned on 23 March 2024 as part of his Extraterrestrial World Tour to an audience of 10,593 with the box office of $1,960,479.

In 2021, it was announced that as a result of the COVID-19 pandemic, the arena would be used as a COVID-19 mass vaccination hub, commencing on 9 August 2021.

The arena has held UFC events in Sydney since 2010, including UFC 110: Nogueira vs. Velasquez on 21 February 2010, UFC 127: Penn vs. Fitch on 27 February 2011, UFC on FX: Alves vs. Kampmann on 3 March 2012, UFC Fight Night: Rockhold vs. Bisping on 8 November 2014, UFC Fight Night: Werdum vs. Tybura on 19 November 2017, UFC 293: Adesanya vs. Strickland on 10 September 2023, UFC 312: du Plessis vs. Strickland 2 on 9 February 2025, and UFC 325: Volkanovski vs. Lopes 2 on 1 February 2026.

It has also hosted several professional wrestling events. In 2001, Australian promotion World Wrestling All-Stars held Inception. In 2026, American promotion All Elite Wrestling will host Grand Slam Sydney.

In March 2026, Linkin Park performed two shows at the venue as part of the world tour supporting their comeback album, From Zero.

In October 2026, Olivia Dean performed two shows at the venue as part of her Art of Loving Live tour, supporting her sophomore album The Art of Loving.

In October 2027, Nickelback will perform one show at the venue as part of their Everything Under the Sun Tour. It will be the band's first tour of Australia since February 2019.

=== Sports teams ===
The venue is the home of the Sydney Kings who compete in Australia's National Basketball League and play all home matches at the SuperDome. The venue is affectionately nicknamed the 'King-Dome' by fans.

Other NBL teams to play home games at the SuperDome include the West Sydney Razorbacks (as a part of double header with a Kings game after) and Melbourne United. Due to the COVID-19 pandemic on 28 May 2021, Melbourne announced they would play a home game at the Arena against the Cairns Taipans. Originally to be played at John Cain Arena, then Cairns Pop-Up Arena, the game commenced with no audience three days later.

The venue is also the former home of Suncorp Super Netball clubs Giants Netball and the New South Wales Swifts, both of whom have played finals and high-profile matches at the arena. Both teams have since relocated to the smaller but newly renovated Ken Rosewall Arena nearby.

=== Attendance records ===
The Sydney Kings have set attendance records for the league on five occasions while playing at the Superdome. In the 1999/2000 season, the Kings hosted a double header at the Superdome with the West Sydney Razorbacks playing the Brisbane Bullets and the Kings playing the Canberra Cannons. This double header set a league record of 17,143 fans in attendance.

In a game against the Illawarra Hawks on 17 November 2019, the Kings set the all-time NBL single game attendance record with 17,514 at the Superdome. A major drawcard for the game was future NBA star and social media icon LaMelo Ball playing for the Hawks.

In Game Three of the 2022 NBL Grand Final series against the Tasmania Jack Jumpers at Qudos Bank Arena, the team attracted a crowd of 16,149 – then the biggest playoff crowd in NBL history and the third-largest crowd overall in NBL history.

In the Grand Final Series of the 2022/2023 season against the New Zealand Breakers, the Sydney Kings set the new single game attendance record and playoff game attendance record twice. With the Kings having home court advantage, Games 1, 3 and 5 were played at the Superdome. On 10 March 2023, a new record of 18,049 attended Game 3 of the series. Just five days later with the series tied at 2 wins each, the Kings prevailed in Game 5 to win the championship in front of another record attendance of 18,124.

The Kings beat their own record twice more in 2026 at the Superdome in similar circumstances. The Kings played the Adelaide 36ers in the 2025–26 Championship Series that went to Game 5. Game 3 of the series saw a new record of 18,373 attend. A week later, 18,589 attended Game 5 on 5 April 2026.

American singer Billie Eilish broke the arena's single-event attendance record during her show on 28 February 2025 as part of her Hit Me Hard And Soft: The Tour, with 21,001 attendees. This record surpassed the previous record of 20,839, which was held by Justin Timberlake on his FutureSex/LoveShow tour on 13 November 2007.

== Gallery ==
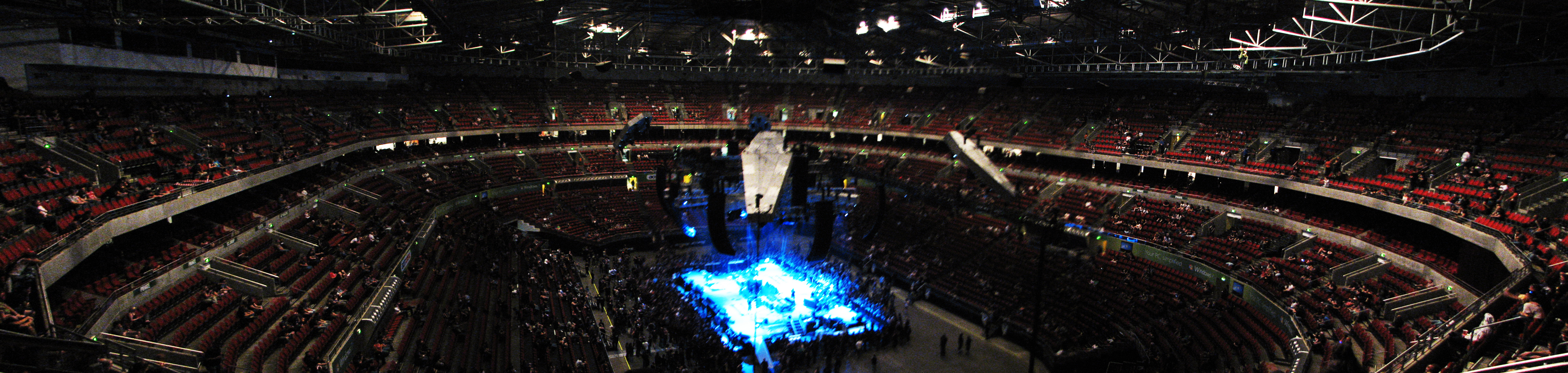
Panorama of the arena before a Metallica concert in 2010
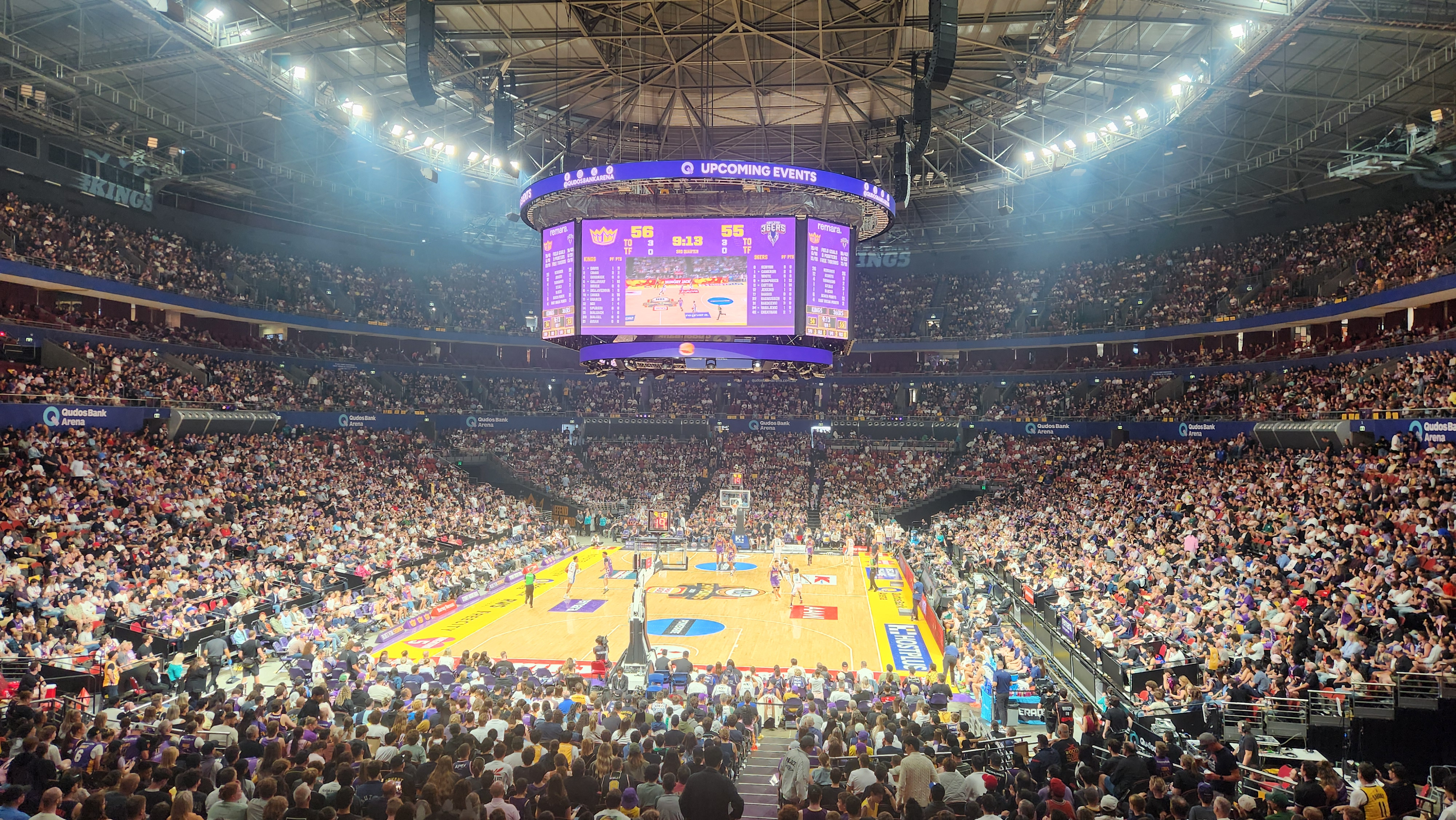
View from Door 16 entryway during a Sydney Kings basketball game in 2026

Events and tenants
Preceded by Pavilhão Atlântico; Lisbon	ATP World Tour Finals; Venue; 2001	Succeeded by New International Expo Center; Shanghai
