= People First Bank =

Australian mutual bank

Heritage and People’s Choice Limited
- Trade name: People First Bank
- Type: Mutual bank
- Industry: Financial services
- Headquarters: Flinders Street, Adelaide, South Australia ('dual head office' located in Ruthven Street, Toowoomba)
- Area served: South Australia; Northern Territory; Victoria; NSW; Queensland
- Key people: Michael Cameron, Chairman; Steve Laidlaw, Chief Executive Officer
- Products: Retail banking; Investments; Insurance; Financial planning
- Total assets: A$23.3 billion
- Members: 730,000
- Number of employees: 2,000
- Website: peoplefirstbank.com.au/

Heritage and People's Choice Limited, trading as People First Bank, is an Australian mutual bank. It is one of Australia's largest mutual banks, with branches located in South Australia, Northern Territory, New South Wales, Queensland, and Victoria, offering loans, credit cards, transaction and savings accounts, mortgages and insurance.

== History ==
In August 2021, People's Choice Credit Union entered into discussions with Heritage Bank about a potential merger, and in April 2022 both companies announced plans to merge. Members gave their approval on 16 November 2022.

On 27 Nov 2023 Heritage and People's Choice announced its new brand, People First Bank.

== People First Stadium ==
Heritage Bank acquired the naming rights to Carrara Stadium, home of the Gold Coast Suns, in 2023. On 8 March 2024 it was rebranded to People First Stadium.

== Sponsorships ==
People's Choice Credit Union began sponsoring the Western Bulldogs in 2017, and in 2024 this sponsorship was rebranded to People First Bank.

== Community Lottery ==
Originally known as the People's Choice Community Lottery, the People First Community Lottery gives local sporting clubs, schools, charities, volunteer groups and other not-for-profit community groups the opportunity to raise funds and achieve fundraising goals. People First Bank facilitate the lottery administration, advertising, prizes and tickets, and the community groups participating receive 100% of every $2 ticket sold.

== See also ==
- Banking in Australia
- List of banks
- List of banks in Australia
- List of banks in Oceania
