= Ridgewood Savings Bank =

Mutual savings bank in New York State

- Type: Mutual savings bank
- Industry: Financial services
- Founded: Ridgewood, New York; June 18, 1921
- Headquarters: Ridgewood, New York, United States
- Area served: New York metropolitan area
- Key people: Leonard Stekol, Chairman and CEO
- Net income: $13 million
- Total assets: $6.8 billion
- Number of employees: 580
- Website: ridgewoodbank.com

Ridgewood Savings Bank is the largest mutual savings bank in New York State and was founded in 1921. It operates 36 branches across New York City's five boroughs, Long Island and Westchester County.

== History ==
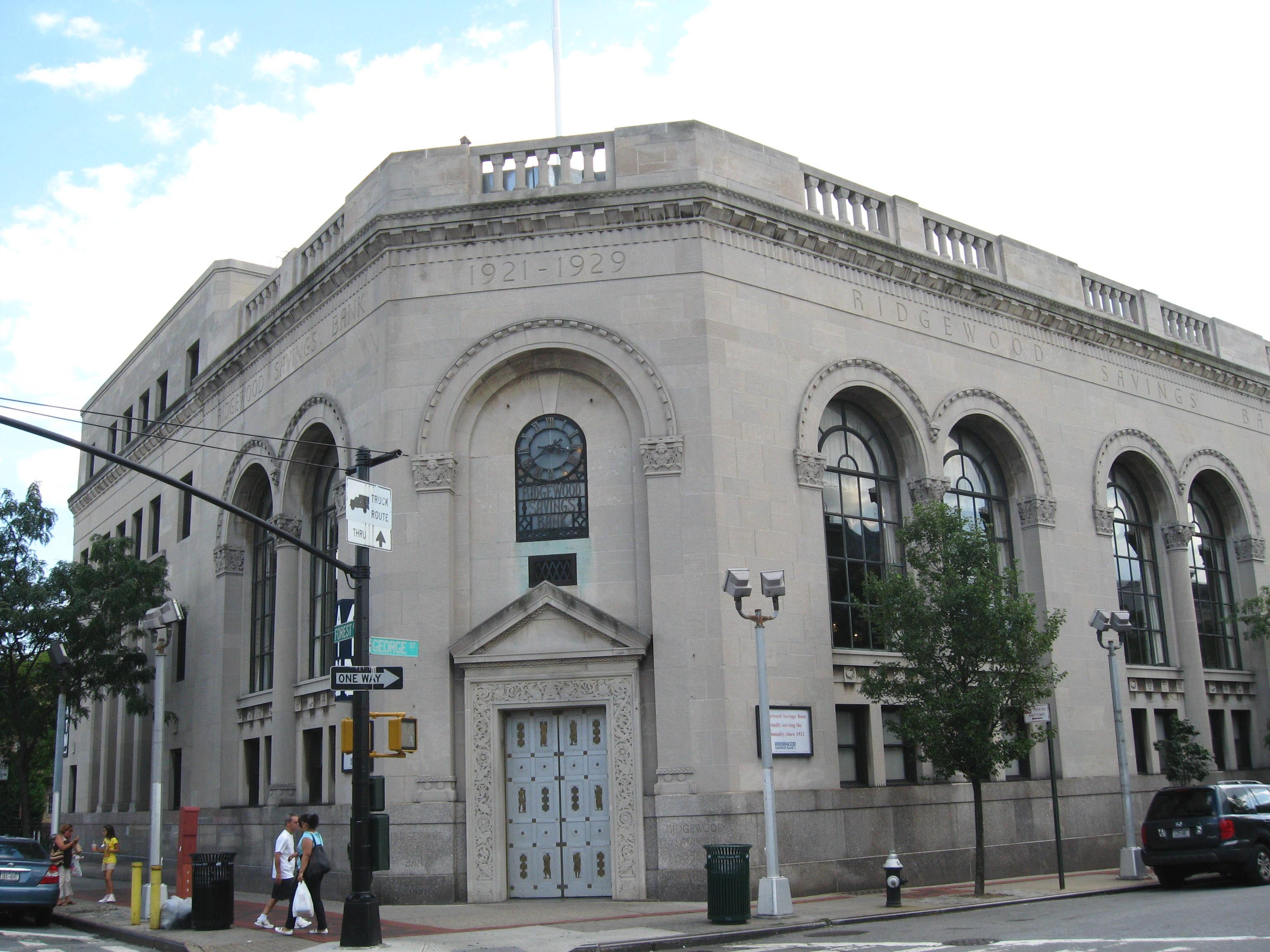
Ridgewood Savings Bank headquarters since 1929, located in Ridgewood, Queens

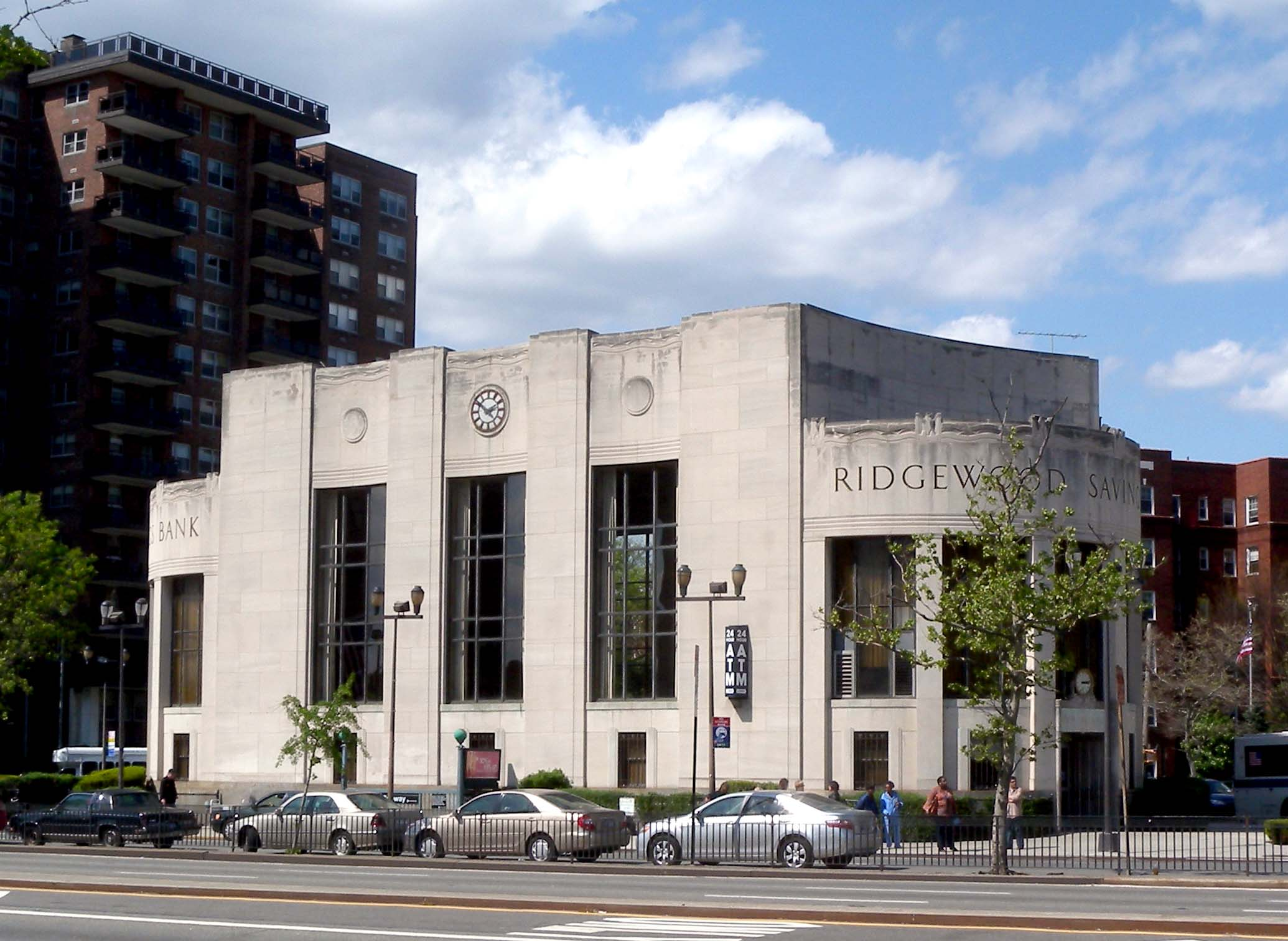
Ridgewood Savings Bank first branch office in Forest Hills, Queens

The bank was chartered as Savings Bank of Ridgewood on June 18, 1921. It began when 14 local businessmen in Ridgewood, Queens, decided to form a mutual savings bank to serve the needs of the community. The bank’s first headquarters was a converted taproom located at the intersection of Myrtle and Forest avenues. In 1929, the cornerstone was laid for a new headquarters at the same site and the name was changed from Savings Bank of Ridgewood to Ridgewood Savings Bank. The building architects were Halsey, McCormack and Helmer, Inc. and the general contractors were Stamarith Construction Corporation. In 1940, the bank opened its first branch office, in Forest Hills, Queens. The building is located at the intersection of Queens Boulevard and 108th Street, and was designated a New York City Landmark in 2000 by the New York City Landmarks Preservation Commission. In 2007, City and Suburban Bank joined Ridgewood Savings, increasing the number of branches by 12.

== List of presidents ==
- Rudolph Stutzmann, 1921–1946
- Herman Ringe, 1946–1948
- Walter J. Hess, 1948–1971
- William A. McKenna Jr., 1990–2003
- William C. McGarry, 2004–2012
- Peter M. Boger, 2012–2018
- Leonard Stekol, 2018–present
