= Teachers Mutual Bank =

Banks of Australia

Teachers Mutual Bank Limited
- Trade name: Teachers Mutual Bank
- Type: Consumers' co-operative
- Industry: Banking
- Founded: 1966
- Headquarters: Barangaroo, New South Wales, Australia
- Area served: Australia
- Key people: Anthony Hughes (Chief executive); Andrew Kearnan (Chairperson)
- Products: Consumer Banking; Wholesale Banking; Wealth Management; Insurance; Travel
- Brands: Firefighters Mutual Bank; UniBank; Health Professionals Bank; Australian Mutual Bank
- Net income: AUD $28.9 million (2026)
- Total assets: ▲ A$14.5 billion (2026)
- Members: ▲ >280 000 (2026)
- Number of employees: ▲ >850 (2026)
- Website: tmbl.com.au

Teachers Mutual Bank Limited is a mutual bank in Australia. Apart from its primary brand, it also trades as the Australian Mutual Bank, UniBank, the Firefighters Mutual Bank and the Health Professionals Bank. It is a Certified B Corporation.

As of 2026, the Teachers Mutual Bank group is the sixth largest mutual bank in Australia.

== Branches ==
The Teachers Mutual Bank has a decentralised membership, although two of its most significant predecessor organisations – the New South Wales Teachers Credit Union (1967-2010) and the Sydney Credit Union (1953-2019) – were based in New South Wales. Since the merger with the Australian Mutual Bank in 2026, there are now nine offices in the Sydney region, one in regional NSW (Charlestown, south of Newcastle) and one each in Melbourne, Perth and Canberra.

From 1976 until 2025 the headquarters were at Homebush, when they were moved to Barangaroo in the Sydney CBD.

== Membership ==
As a mutually owned institution, each account holder holds one equal share in the organisation. All profits are intended to be returned to members by way of fees and interest rates that are lower than those available from commercial banks and other for-profit financial institutions.

Membership of the Teachers' Credit Union was initially restricted to public school teachers in New South Wales (and their immediate families) but was later extended to private school teachers, TAFE teachers and all workers in the education sector. While non-members can take out term deposits, all savings and loan accounts are restricted to members who must be (currently or formerly) working in the education sector or a family member of a member.

Membership from other service industries became possible under alternate brands after the merger with the Fire Brigades Employees' Credit Union in 2016 and the creation of the Health Professionals Bank brand.

Before merging, UniCredit allowed not only staff but also current students and graduates of any Australian university to join. Thus the UniBank brand became accessible to far more potential members. Since the merger with the Australian Mutual Bank in 2026, membership is now open to all Australian citizens and permanent residents.

== History ==
The Hornsby Teachers Association Credit Union was formed on 27 September 1966. In order to gain authority for payroll deductions from the Department of Education, they opened membership to all NSW public school teachers, changing their name to NSW Teachers Credit Union at the first annual meeting in 1967 and to Teachers Credit Union in 2010.

In 1991 the Teachers Credit Union was the largest credit union in Australia with 65,448 members and deposits of more than $276 million. It became a mutual bank in 2012. The Teachers Mutual Bank consistently ranks among the top ten largest customer-owned financial institutions in Australia.

From June 2021 to March 2025, the Teachers Mutual Bank operated an online-only brand called Hiver. Modelled on other online brands such as Bendigo Bank's Up and NAB's UBank, Hiver was marketed as "Australia's first digital bank for essential workers". After the brand was discontinued, Hiver members were transferred to UniBank.

A number of mergers with other credit unions and mutual banks have expanded and diversified its membership considerably.

=== TAFE and Community Credit Union ===
The Technical Education Co-operative Credit Union was first registered in NSW in 1957. It was named The TAFE Credit Union from 1981 to 1999.

In June 1997, The TAFE Credit Union absorbed Eagle Credit Union. When the TAFE and Community Credit Union merged with the NSW Teachers Credit Union in November 2008, it had approximately 6,000 members, who became members of the Teachers Credit Union.

=== UniBank ===
The University Staff Credit Society Limited was founded in 1963 by employees of the School of Chemistry at the University of Western Australia. It began trading in March 1964 with James Vallve as the inaugural chair.

The Credit Society traded under the name UniCredit from 1985. They merged with the Teachers Mutual Bank on 1 August 2015, with members continuing under the name UniBank.

=== Firefighters Mutual Bank ===
The Fire Board (NSW) Employees Credit Union was founded on 12 September 1968 at Fire Brigade Headquarters in Castlereagh Street, Sydney.

The name was changed to Fire Brigades Employees Credit Union Limited in 1990. After merging with the Teachers Mutual Bank in 2016, members continued under the name Firefighters Mutual Bank.

=== Pulse Credit Union ===
In December 1976 the Royal Women's Hospital Staff Credit Co-operative was registered in Victoria. The co-operative was known as the Metropolitan Hospital Staff Credit Co-operative from 1978 to 1981, then as the Health Services Credit Co-operative until 1997 when it became Pulse Credit Union.

A number of other credit societies merged with it including the Austin Hospital Staff Credit Co-operative (in 1985), HBA Credit Co-operative (in 1990) and St Vincent's Hospital Employees Co-operative Credit Society (in 1994). In 2011, La Trobe University Credit Union Co-operative and Melbourne University Credit Union became divisions of Pulse Credit Union (continuing to trade under those names).

In November 2025 the Teachers Mutual Bank absorbed the Pulse Credit Union, incorporating its 6000 members into the UniBank and the Health Professionals Bank divisions.

=== Australian Mutual Bank ===
The Australian Mutual Bank was the culmination of mergers between 74 credit unions over 69 years, most notably in 2019, when the Sydney Credit Union and the Endeavour Mutual Bank merged to become the Australian Mutual Bank. They continued to trade using the names Sydney Mutual Bank and Endeavour Mutual Bank until 2021 when both brands became the Australian Mutual Bank.

On 1st May 2026, Australian Mutual Bank merged with Teachers Mutual Bank; the Australian Mutual Bank brand continues alongside the other four brands of Teachers Mutual Bank Limited.

==== Encompass and Select Credit Unions ====
The Motor Transport Employees Savings & Loans Co-op (founded 1953) would in 1991 merge with Railways Staff Credit Union (founded 1966) to form the Transrail Credit Union, changing their name to Encompass Credit Union in 1997. Other credit unions were absorbed, including Ryde Omnibus Depot Credit Union (1963-1997), Raleigh Park Employees Credit Union (1969-1999), Waverley Bus Depot Employees Co-operative Credit Union (1966-2000).

The Sydney County Council Employees Credit Union was founded in 1963 and changed its name to Select Credit Union in 1994. Other credit unions were absorbed, including Brisbane Water Area (Electricity) Employees Credit Union (1965-1982), Orion Credit Union (1965-1996), Willoughby North Sydney Omnibus Depot Employees Credit Union (1966-1997), Access (NSW) Credit Union (1965-2001), CSR and Rinker Employees Credit Union (1956-2009), MemberFirst Credit Union (1963-2012) and Tartan Credit Union (2013).

When Select Credit Union merged with Encompass Credit Union in 2016, they became Select Encompass Credit Union, then changed their name to Endeavour Mutual Bank in 2018.

==== Sydney Credit Union ====
The City Council Employees’ Credit Union Co-operative was formed in May 1963 by employees of the City of Sydney Council, later changing their name to the Sydney Credit Union.

In July 1963 the Prospect County Council Employees Credit Union was registered, changing their name to Prospect County Credit Union in 1983 and to Prospect Credit Union in 1993. The credit union absorbed several others, including Holroyd Municipal Council Employees Credit Union (1969), Fairfield City Council Employees Credit Union (1982), Campbelltown City Council Employees Credit Union (1994), Nepean District Staff Credit Union (1994), Boral Employees Credit Union (1997), Blacktown City Council Employees Credit Union (1998) and Auburn Municipal Council Employees Credit Union (2000). In December 2005 Prospect Credit Union was absorbed by Sydney Credit Union.

The Waverley Municipal Council Employees Credit Union was registered in 1965 and was absorbed by Sydney Credit Union in 1982.

The Karpaty Ukrainian Credit Union was founded in November 1970 and absorbed two other Ukrainian credit unions – Dnipro Ukrainian Credit Union (1950-1993) and Concord Ukrainian Credit Union (1983-1999) – before itself being absorbed by the Sydney Credit Union in 2010. The Karpaty Society continues providing 'grants and scholarships to individuals and organisations for the purpose of building a fair, just, creative and caring society - particularly in relation to the Ukrainian community in Australia and in Ukraine.'

== See also ==
- Banking in Australia
- List of banks
- List of banks in Australia
- List of banks in Oceania
