= Beyond Bank =

Australian customer-owned bank

Beyond Bank Australia Ltd
- Trade name: Beyond Bank Australia
- Type: Mutual Bank
- Industry: Banking
- Headquarters: Adelaide, Australia
- Products: Retail banking
- Total assets: $8,290.9 million
- Members: 280,000
- Number of employees: 650
- Website: beyondbank.com.au

Beyond Bank is an Australian customer-owned bank operating in South Australia, Victoria, the Australian Capital Territory, Western Australia and New South Wales. It provides financial services to its members, including savings and business accounts, term deposits, loans, insurance and financial planning, and has total assets under management of more than $5 billion. It is a certified B Corp.

== History ==
Beyond Bank has operated under that name since August 2013 when the Community CPS became a mutual bank.

It has evolved through a series of mergers of various credit unions, both before and after the 2013 transition to mutual bank status:

- In March 2006, Community CPS Australia Ltd was formed in a merger between the Commonwealth public servants credit unions - CPS Credit Union (SA) Ltd and CPS Credit Union Co-operative (ACT) Ltd.
- In November 2008, Western Australian based United Credit Union Ltd and Westax merged with Community CPS and carried on business under the name United Community.
- In May 2009 the Polish Community Credit Union also merged with Community CPS.
- On 1 January 2010, Hunter Region-based Companion Credit Union (formerly Northern Mineworkers Credit Union) merged with Community CPS.
- In June 2011 Wagga Mutual Credit Union, based in the Riverina, merged with Community CPS.
- In August 2013 Alliance One Credit Union merged with Community CPS and all previously merged entities were rebranded to create Beyond Bank.
- In April 2016 Country First Credit Union, based in Griffth, merged with Beyond Bank.
- In May 2016 Beyond Bank acquired Universal Financial Planning in the Hunter region.
- In February 2018 My Credit Union, based in NSW, merged with Beyond Bank.
- On 1 March 2020, Nexus Mutual (formerly Esso employees credit union), based in Melbourne, merged with Beyond Bank.
- On 1 April 2022, South West Mutual Credit Union, based in Warrnambool, merged with Beyond Bank, bringing their 13,000 customers.
- On 1 February 2024, First Choice Credit Union, based in Orange, New South Wales, merged with Beyond Bank, bringing their 4,000 customers.
- On 1 March 2024, AWA Alliance Bank, originally the Point Henry Credit Co-operative for employees of Alcoa in Geelong, merged with Beyond Bank, bringing with them 40,000 customers.
- On 1 March 2026, Family First Bank (formerly Lithgow Mutual Credit Union) was absorbed into Beyond Bank.

== Accolades ==
In 2012 Community CPS was named Money Magazine's Credit Union of the Year 2012 and awarded the 2012 Mozo People's Choice Award for Best Credit Union.

In June 2016 Beyond Bank became a certified B Corp.
