= Qudos Bank =

Customer-owned bank in Australia

Qudos Mutual Limited
- Trade name: Qudos Bank
- Formerly: Qantas Credit Union
- Type: Mutual Bank; Customer-owned financial institution
- Founded: 1 November 1959; 67 years ago in Sydney
- Headquarters: Mascot, Sydney, Australia
- Key people: Damien Walsh (Managing Director)
- Net income: ▼ A$21.47 million (2024)
- Total assets: ▲ A$5.77 billion (2024)
- Members: 100,249 (2024)

Bank Australia Limited, trading as Qudos Bank, is an Australian mutual bank that provides retail banking products and services, including home loans, personal loans, car loans, credit cards, savings, financial planning assistance, and foreign exchange.

Bank Australia Limited is an unlisted public company owned by its customer-members and governed by a Board of Directors. It operates 15 branches across New South Wales, Victoria, Queensland, and the ACT. As of October 2020, Qudos Bank had a market share of 0.2% of household lending balances and 0.3% of household deposit balances.

== History ==
=== Early history ===
On 19 August 1959, a group of 14 Sydney-based Qantas employees met and resolved to lodge an application to register the Qantas Staff Co-operative Credit Union Limited. The organisation received its registration as a credit union on 10 September 1959 and began operating on 1 November of the same year.

Membership was initially restricted to Qantas employees based in Sydney, although by 1964 employees of British Airways and Air New Zealand were permitted to join. In 1963, the credit union claimed that 20% of Australian-based Qantas staff were members, which was claimed to have increased to 50% by 1969 and 90% by 1980. In 1970, the word "co-operative" was removed from the name of the organisation.

=== Present era ===
==== Qantas Credit Union ====
The Credit Union started to broaden its reach in 1996 when it commenced lending to non-Qantas employees. By 2011, the constitution posted on the organisation's website allowed existing members to nominate new members, rather than membership eligibility depending on a person's employment or family connections. As staff are members under the constitution, they were able to nominate new members, thereby allowing anyone to join the credit union.

On 31 October 2012, the Qantas Staff Credit Union registered the business name Qantas Credit Union, and, from late 2012, it traded as the Qantas Credit Union, with the re-branding completed in 2013.

By 2014, the organisation had grown to 90,000 members and, by then, two-thirds of members were not employed by Qantas.

==== Qudos Bank ====
The idea of changing the name of the organisation to include the term bank was first mentioned in the 2015 annual report, with chairman Mark Boesen stating that the board believed a change was necessary because of confusion around membership eligibility due to the association with Qantas Airways, and the use of the term credit union limiting the organisation's growth. During the transition to the name Qudos Bank, the organisation stated that Qantas requested the organisation cease using the Qantas name, as well as branding similar to, or associated with, Qantas.

At its 56th annual general meeting, members voted in favour to change the legal name of the organisation to "Qudos Mutual Limited", enabling it to apply to the Australian Prudential and Regulation Authority for consent to trade as "Qudos Bank". 75% was needed for the motion to pass and 79.98% of the members voted in favour of the change.

On 4 April 2016, Qudos Bank was created, with the name being a play on the word "kudos". Along with the name change, the organisation also adopted a new slogan" "so unbank like".

On 14 April 2025, members voted at a Special General Meeting to approve a merger with Bank Australia The likely date for the merger is 1 July 2025 with the Qudos Bank brand retained.

On 1 July 2025, Qudos Mutual Limited ABN 53 087 650 557 has completed the total transfer of the business to Bank Australia Limited ABN 21 087 651 607.

== Corporate affairs ==
=== Promotional activities ===
At the beginning of 2014, the organisation purchased the naming rights to the Sydney Entertainment Centre, with the venue becoming known as the Qantas Credit Union Arena. It had been intended to demolish the venue at the end of 2013, but the naming rights deal saw the venue remain open until December 2015.

In April 2016, Qudos Bank secured a multi-year naming rights deal for the Sydney Super Dome, most recently known as the Allphones Arena for ten years.

== Products and services ==
Qudos Bank provides a variety of financial banking products and services, including home loans, credit cards, personal loans and several types of savings accounts, as well as financial planning, general insurance, and foreign currency.
