= Mutual savings bank =

Depositor-owned savings institution without capital stock

A mutual savings bank is a financial institution chartered by a central or regional government, without capital stock, owned by its members who subscribe to a common fund. From this fund, claims, loans, etc., are paid. Profits after deductions are shared among the members. The institution is intended to provide a safe place for individual members to save and to invest those savings in mortgages, loans, stocks, bonds and other securities and to share in any profits or losses that result.

== History ==
The institution most frequently identified as the first modern savings bank was the "Savings and Friendly Society" organized in 1810 by Rev. Henry Duncan of the Ruthwell Presbyterian Church in Dumfriesshire, Scotland. Duncan established a friendly society to create a cooperative depository institution in order to enable his poorest parishioners to hold savings accounts accruing interest for sickness and old-age. Another precursor of modern savings banks were the ideas of Friedrich Wilhelm Raiffeisen that led to rural credit unions and cooperative banks. European voluntary organizations and "friendly societies" provided the inspiration for their state-incorporated American counterparts.

These first savings banks were envisioned as philanthropic endeavors, designed to uplift the poor and working classes. The banks were started by philanthropists who took on the positions of savings bank trustees, managers, and directors as opportunities to teach the working class the virtues of thrift and self-reliance by allowing them the security to save their money. The first incorporated US mutual savings bank was the Provident Institution for Savings in Boston. Its 1816 charter was the first government legislation in the world to safeguard savings banks. In 2015, the oldest (and largest) mutual bank in the U.S. was Eastern Bank of Boston, with approximately $10 billion in assets. It was chartered in 1818 in Salem, Massachusetts, as the Salem Savings Bank. In 2020, Eastern Bank demutualized and listed its stock on the New York Stock Exchange.

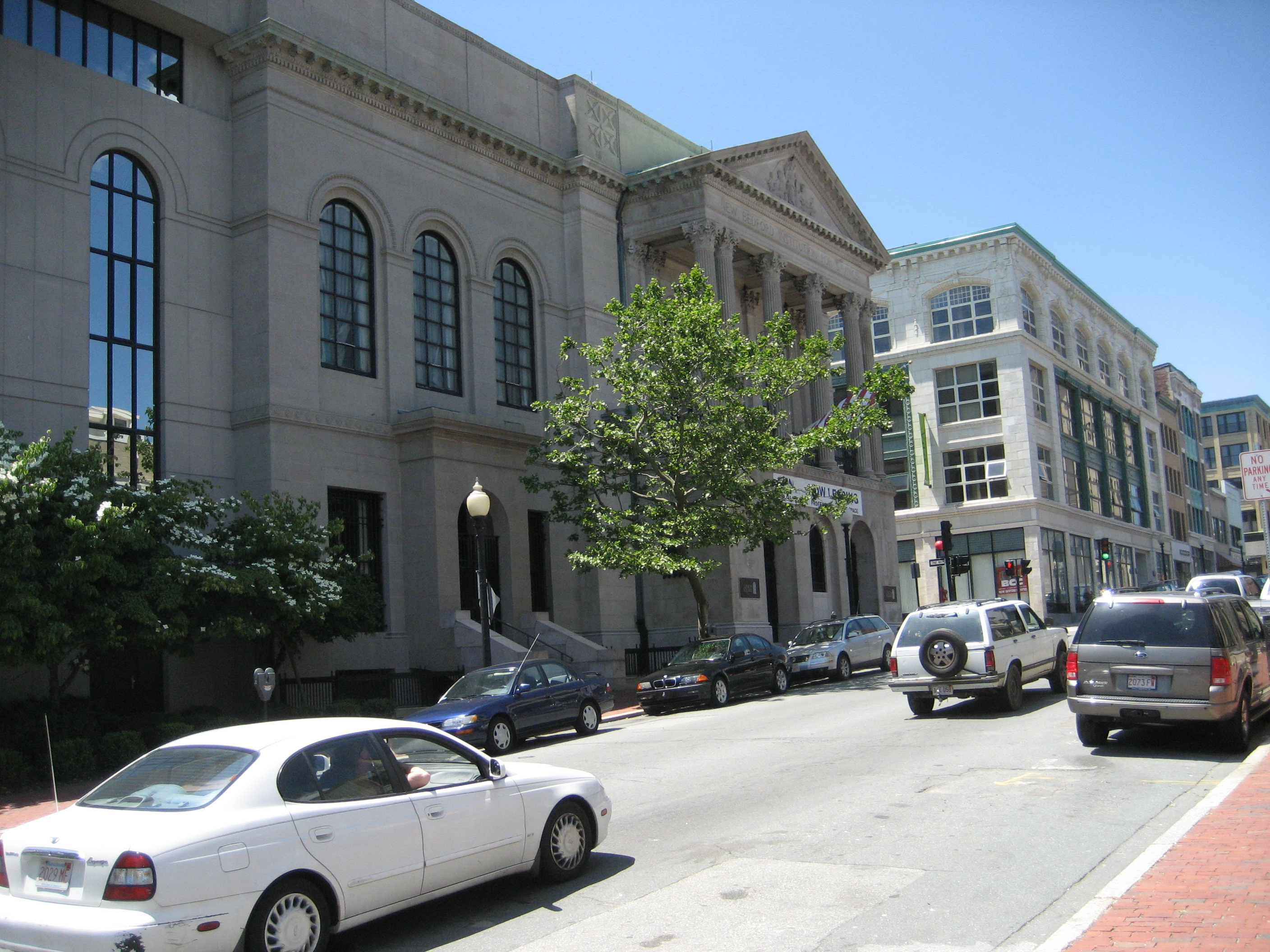
Mutual savings banks are common in New England. New Bedford Institution For Savings was founded in 1825, and converted from mutual to stock status in 1987.

Since the 1970s, when the industry was deregulated, thousands of mutual savings banks have been converted into stock ownership companies, raising more than $40 billion. In 2010, only about 600 remained. These conversions have often resulted in large financial rewards for top bank executives. Current mutual saving banks include Dollar Bank, Ridgewood Savings Bank, Middlesex Savings Bank, Liberty Bank, and Marquette Savings Bank.

=== Mutual banking in Australia ===
Beginning in the 1980s, several building societies in Australia converted to banks, but were required to demutualize when doing so. These included Advance Bank (formerly NSW Building Society), St. George, Suncorp, Metway Bank, Challenge Bank, Bank of Melbourne and Bendigo Bank. A change in regulation meant that building societies and credit unions were no longer required to demutualize upon converting to banks, and several, including Heritage Bank, have converted since 2011 while retaining their status and structure as mutual organizations.

== Use and design ==
Mutual savings banks were designed to stimulate savings by individuals; the exclusive function of these banks is to protect deposits, make limited, secure investments, and to provide depositors with interest. Unlike commercial banks, savings banks have no stockholders; the entirety of profits beyond the upkeep of the bank belongs to the depositors of the mutual savings bank. Mutual savings banks prioritize security, and as a result, have historically been characteristically conservative in their investments. This conservatism is what allowed mutual savings banks to remain stable throughout the turbulent period of the Great Depression, despite the failing of commercial banks and savings and loan associations. Marquette Savings Bank is a great example of this, having been praised by The Economist for its performance during the 2008 financial crisis.

== See also ==
- Bank
- Building society
- Cooperative banking
- Credit union
- Capital market
- Demutualization
- Mutual organization
