= Governor Graham =

Governor Graham may refer to:

- Bob Graham (born 1936), 38th Governor of Florida
- Horace F. Graham (1862–1941), 56th Governor of Vermont
- Lancelot Graham (1880–1958), Governor of Sind from 1936 to 1941
- Stephen Victor Graham (1874–1955), 18th Governor of American Samoa
- William Alexander Graham (1804–1875), 30th Governor of North Carolina
