= Bank South Pacific =

Largest bank in Papua New Guinea

BSP Financial Group Limited

- BSP Headquarters in Port Moresby
- Type: Public
- Traded as: PoMSOX: ASX:
- Industry: Financial services
- Founded: 1957
- Headquarters: Port Moresby, Papua New Guinea
- Area served: Papua New Guinea; Fiji; Solomon Islands; Samoa; Tonga; Cook Islands; Vanuatu
- Key people: Mark T. Robinson (Group Chief Executive Officer); Robert Bradshaw (Chairman)
- Products: Banking, financial and related services
- Revenue: ▲K3.407 billion PGK (2025)
- Net income: ▲K1,172 million PGK (2025)
- Number of employees: 4,900 full time equivalent
- Website: www.bsp.com.pg

BSP Financial Group Limited (BSP) is a banking and financial services group in the South Pacific, headquartered in Papua New Guinea. BSP's regional network includes Papua New Guinea, Fiji, Solomon Islands, Samoa, Tonga and Cook Islands, along with a presence in Vanuatu. BSP is listed on the Papua New Guinea Stock Exchange (PNGX) and the Australian Securities Exchange (ASX) under the ticker code BFL.

== History ==
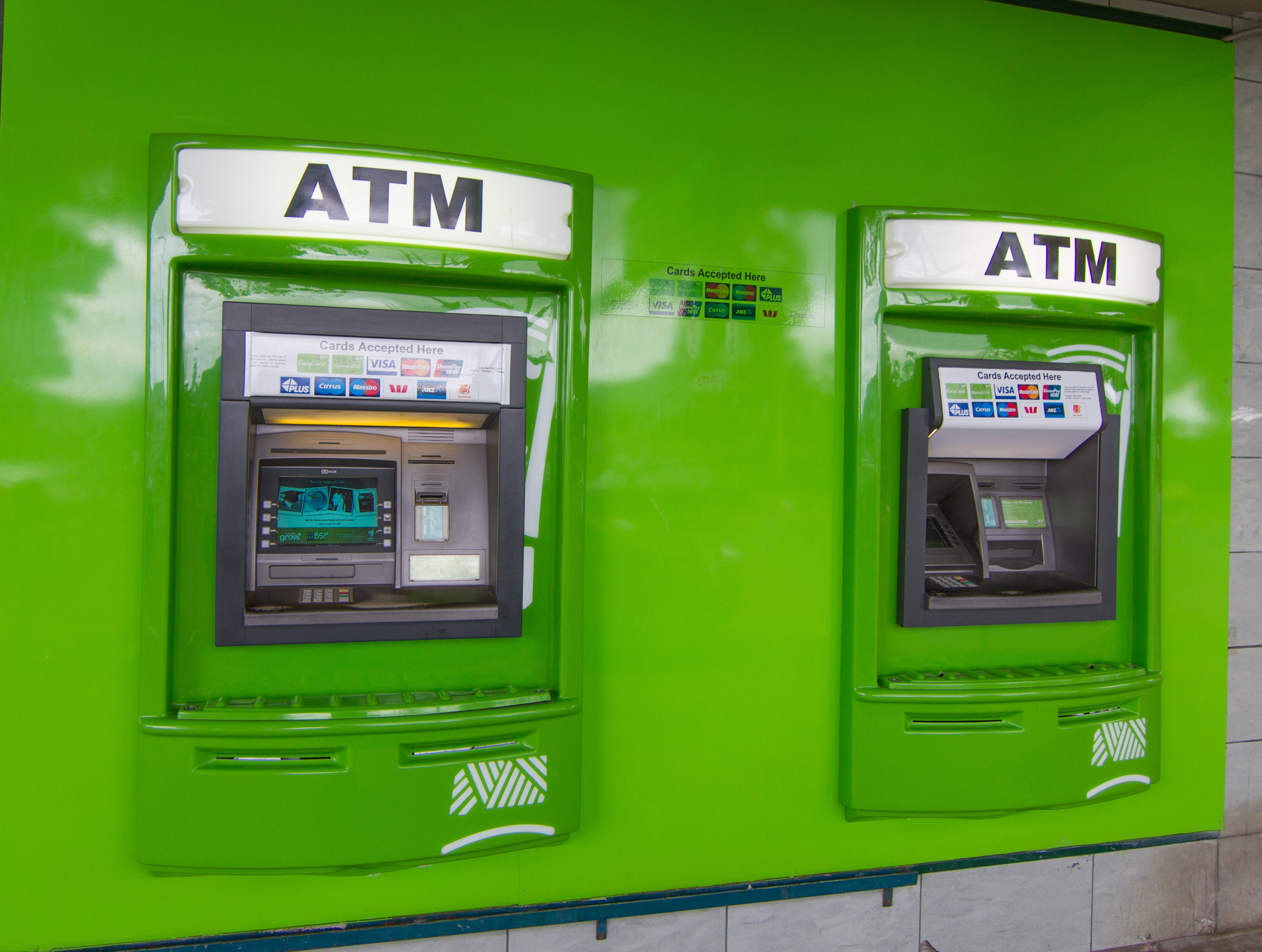
BSP Bank ATMs at Sigatoka Town Centre

BSP traces its history to 1 May 1957, when the National Bank of Australasia established a branch in Port Moresby. As independence approached for Papua New Guinea (PNG), the incoming government made known its desire that all banks in PNG be locally incorporated, rather than branches of a foreign parent. Bank of Papua New Guinea, the country's central bank, was established in 1973. The National Australia Bank (NAB) incorporated its operations in PNG in 1974. Then the government encouraged the bank to sell equity to local citizens. BSP conducted public offerings in 1980 and 1981, with the result that local citizens came to hold 13% of the bank's shares. Later, the government decided to acquire control of BSP. In 1993, National Investment Holdings Limited (NIHL) first acquired NAB's 87% shareholding, and then the 13% of the shares in the hands of the public, giving it 100% ownership of BSP. In 1995 the government decided to increase the bank's capital base, which it achieved by selling a 25% stake to Credit Corporation (PNG) and a 22% stake to Motor Vehicles Insurance (PNG) Trust (now incorporated as Motor Vehicles Insurance Limited).

In 1916, Commonwealth Bank, the Australian government-owned bank, established a branch in Rabaul and agencies in other towns, to support the banking needs of the Australian Army and its troops who had taken control of the former German colony of New Guinea. In time, this operation became a full-fledged commercial banking operation. Then in 1974, Commonwealth Bank withdrew from PNG by transferring its operations to the new government, which gave the bank the name "Papua New Guinea Banking Corporation" (PNGBC). In 2002, PNGBC ran into problems, and BSP acquired the government's 49% stake in PNGBC in return for the government taking a 25% stake in BSP. Between 2002 and 2008 BSP and PNGBC merged the operations.

On 25 May 2021, BSP listed on the Australian Stock Exchange.

BSP unveiled a new logo, combining the kundu iconography with elements representing the broader South Pacific region.

=== South Pacific expansion ===
Since 2004, BSP has pursued a strategy of expanding in the South Pacific. It acquired Westpac's branch in Niue, which was the only bank of any kind on the island. Westpac had established the branch in 1988 but was interested in reducing some of its operations in the area. In April 2013, BSP sold the Niue branch to New Zealand bank Kiwibank.

In 2006, BSP acquired the National Bank of Solomon Islands from the Solomon Islands government, which at the time had the largest network of offices (eight branches and eight agencies) in the islands. BSP also acquired Habib Bank (Fiji), which had begun in 1991 as a branch of HBL Pakistan.

In October 2009, BSP acquired the Colonial National Bank in Fiji from the Commonwealth Bank.

=== Operations in Samoa, Cook Islands, Solomon Islands, Vanuatu, and Tonga ===
In 1988, Westpac acquired the European Pacific Banking Corporation in the Cook Islands and a HSBC subsidiary, the Solomon Islands Banking Corporation, which HSBC had established as a branch in 1973. Westpac also acquired HSBC's branches, one each, in Fiji and the New Hebrides (now Vanuatu). (HSBC had established its branch in Fiji only some 18 months earlier.) In 1990, Bank of New Zealand sold half its shares in Bank of Tonga to Westpac and half to Bank of Hawaii, giving each of them 30%. In 2001 Bank of Hawaii sold its interest in Pacific Commercial Bank (42.7%) to Westpac, which held an equal portion. WBC offered Samoan investors, who held the remaining shares, the same price it had paid Bank of Hawaii. Westpac ended up owning 93.5% of Westpac Bank Samoa and Samoan companies and individuals owned 6.5%. In Tonga, Bank of Hawaii sold its shares in Bank of Tonga to Westpac, giving WBC 60% ownership of what became Westpac Bank of Tonga. On 29 January 2015, BSP announced that BSP had entered into an agreement to acquire Westpac's banking operations in Samoa, Cook Islands, Solomon Islands, Vanuatu, and Tonga for A$125 million. The final stage of the acquisition was completed in July 2016.

In July 2020, BSP celebrated its fifth anniversary of operations in the Cook Islands.
