= Commonwealth Trading Bank Building =

Historic building in Sydney, Australia

Commonwealth Trading Bank building
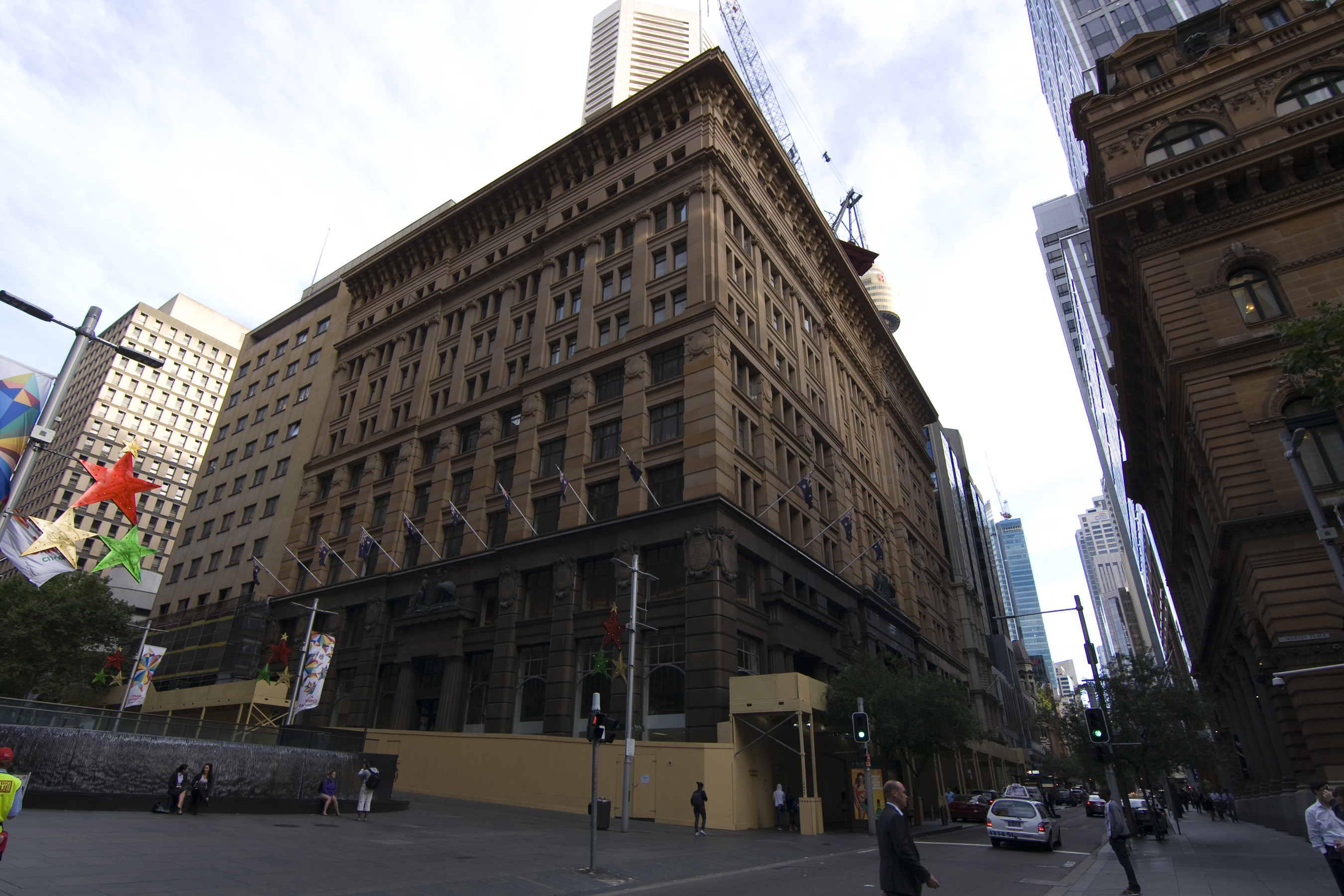
- Commonwealth Trading Bank building viewed from the corner of Martin Place and Pitt Street, while under renovation in 2012, prior to demolition of the 1960s annex (left)

- Location within Sydney
- Alternative names: Money Box building (also sometimes confused with the State Savings Bank Building)

General information
- Status: Completed
- Type: Retail/Office
- Architectural style: Grecian Doric, Art Deco
- Location: Sydney CBD, 108-120 Pitt Street, Sydney, New South Wales, Australia
- Coordinates: 33°52′4.46″S 151°12′31.87″E
- Groundbreaking: 14 May 1913
- Construction started: 1913
- Completed: 24 July 1916
- Opened: 22 August 1916
- Renovated: 1929–1933; 2011–2012
- Cost: £164,457
- Renovation cost: A$330 million
- Client: Commonwealth Bank; Australian Government
- Owner: Cbus (50%); Commonwealth Property Office Fund (50%)

Height
- Height: 81 metres (266 ft)

Technical details
- Floor count: 12
- Floor area: 33,000 square metres (360,000 sq ft)
- Grounds: 3,347 square metres (36,030 sq ft)

Design and construction
- Architects: John & H.G Kirkpatrick
- Main contractor: Henry Phippard of Phippard Bros
- Designations: City of Sydney Register of the National Estate (21/03/1978)

Renovating team
- Architect: E. H. Henderson & F. Hill (1929-33)
- Other designers: Commonwealth Department of Works
- Main contractor: John Grant & Sons (1929-33)

Website
- 5martinplace.com.au

New South Wales Heritage Register
- Official name: Commonwealth Trading Bank Building
- Type: State heritage (built)
- Designated: 14 December 2012
- Reference no.: 1837
- Category: Bank
- Collection: Commercial
- Integrity: Externally intact

The Commonwealth Trading Bank Building, also known as the Commonwealth Bank Building, is a historically significant building in the Sydney central business district, New South Wales, Australia, located on the corner of Pitt Street and Martin Place. It was formerly the headquarters of the Commonwealth Bank of Australia, which for a significant part of the 20th century functioned as Australia's central bank.

== History ==
The Commonwealth Bank was created in 1911 under order of Prime Minister Andrew Fisher. Its head office was designed by architect John Kirkpatrick, who was the cousin of the bank's governor. In August 1916, the building opened. The building was expanded with extensions designed by E.H. Henderson and F. Hill between 1929 and 1933 along Pitt Street, and in 1966 construction was begun on an annex facing Martin Place, completed in 1967.

From 2012 the building was extensively refurbished. The 1960s extension was rebuilt, while much of the 1916 building and 1930s extension was stripped out and refurbished. The building now houses retail space in the old banking hall.

== Significance ==
The building was listed on the now defunct Register of the National Estate between 1978 until the register's abolition in 2007, and it is now listed on the City of Sydney local government heritage register. The building is described as a national symbol, "the first and very substantial physical manifestation of the powers that the Commonwealth Government acquired in the area of banking after the federation of the Australian colonies." The building is also regarded as significant for its design, combining Grecian Doric, Art Deco and other influences.

The image of the building itself became familiar to many people across Australia during the 20th century through its use on money boxes issued by the Commonwealth Bank to children starting from 1922. The money boxes were rectangular shape, roughly reflecting the dimensions of the bank building, and printed with the building's exterior. As a result, it is referred to as the "money box building". (The State Savings Bank building at 48 Martin Place was also featured on some later money boxes, and is also sometimes called the "money box building").

== Gallery ==
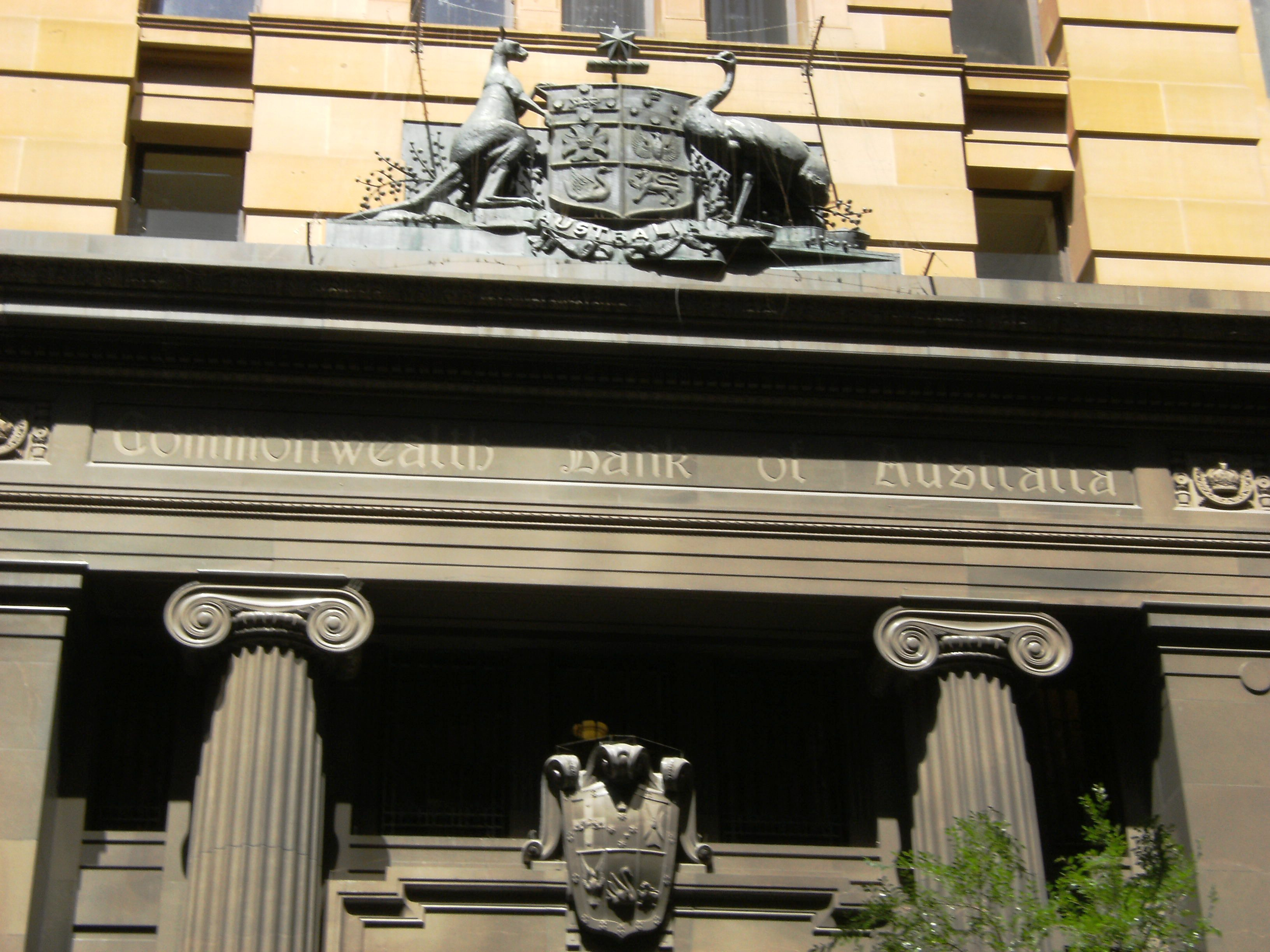
Coat of arms above the entrance

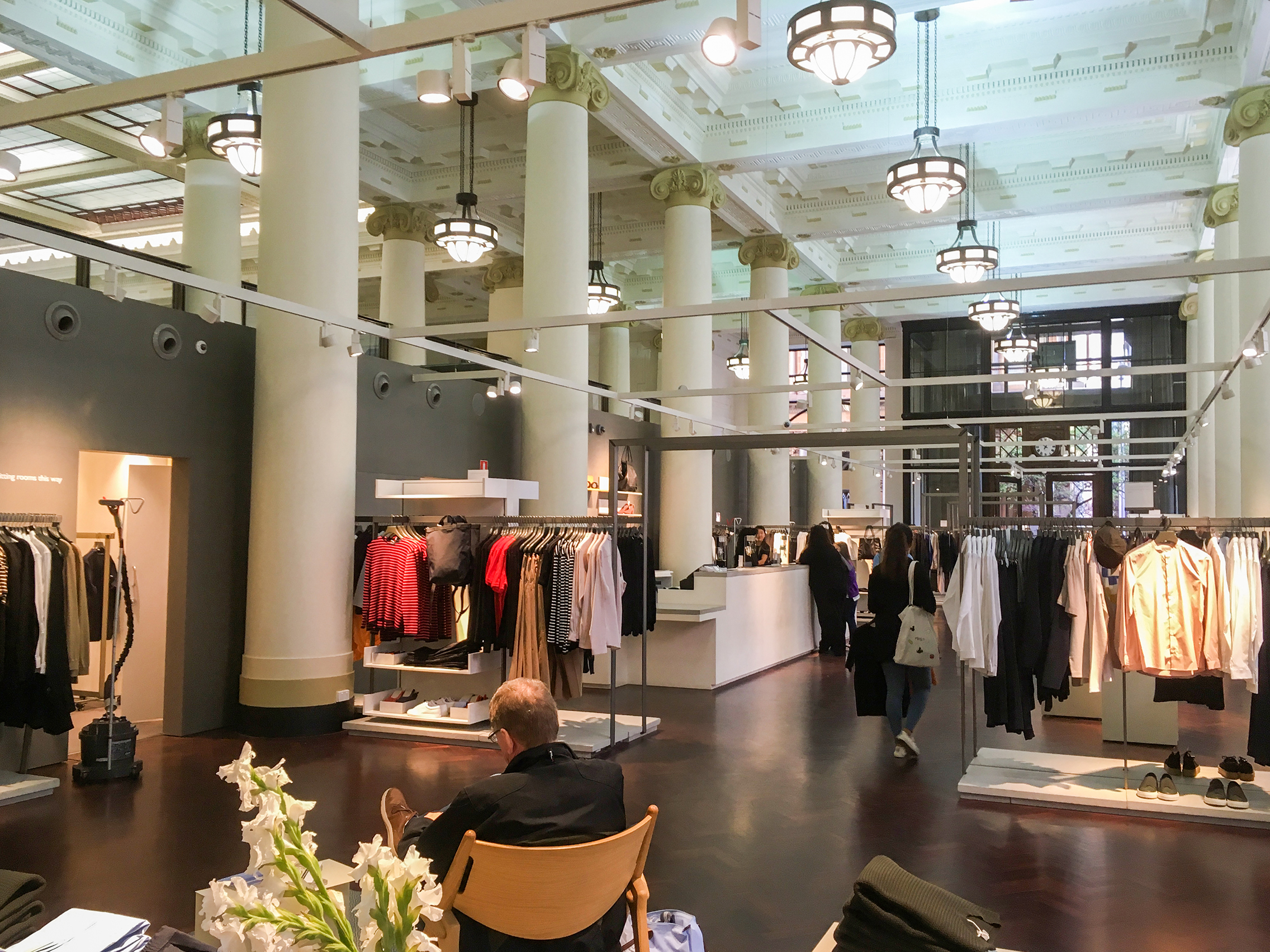
One of the part of the building become COS Fashion store

== See also ==
- Architecture of Sydney
- Australian non-residential architectural styles
