= Donald Neil Sanders =

Australian businessman and public servant

Donald Neil Sanders AO CB
- Born: June 1927; Sydney, Australia
- Died: 15 November 2020 (aged 93)
- Education: University of Sydney
- Organizations: Commonwealth Bank; Reserve Bank of Australia
- Title: Managing Director, Chief Executive Officer of the Commonwealth Bank
- Term: March 1987–December 1990 (MD); January 1991–June 1992 (CEO)
- Predecessor: Vern Christie
- Successor: David Murray

Donald Neil Sanders was an Australian public servant and businessman who was a former managing director and chief executive officer of the Commonwealth Bank and Deputy Governor of the Reserve Bank of Australia.

Business positions
Preceded by Vern Christie	Managing Director of the Commonwealth Bank; March 1987 – December 1990	Succeeded by Title changed
Preceded by New title	Chief Executive Officer of the Commonwealth Bank; January 1991 – June 1992	Succeeded by David Murray
