= National Bank of Solomon Islands =

Retail bank in Solomon Islands

- Company type: Subsidiary
- Industry: Financial services
- Founded: 1951
- Headquarters: Honiara, Solomon Islands
- Area served: Solomon Islands
- Products: Banking, financial and related services
- Owner: Bank South Pacific
- Website: www.bsp.com.sb

National Bank of Solomon Islands (NBSI) was a retail bank operating in Solomon Islands that had been part of the Bank South Pacific (BSP) since 2007. It had the largest network of offices (eight branches and eight agencies) in the islands. Although the bank overall was profitable, the offices outside Honiara, the capital, were running at a loss before Papua New Guinea’s largest bank acquired the bank and rebranded the bank as BSP.

== History ==
In 1951 Commonwealth Bank of Australia, the government-owned Australian bank, established a branch in Solomon Islands. In 1981 Commonwealth transferred its operations in Solomon Islands to the National Bank of Solomon Islands, which operated a joint venture (51-49, Commonwealth and Government of Solomon Islands). At the time the bank had two branches, 14 agencies, and some 50 staff. In 1994 Commonwealth sold its shares in the National Bank of Solomon Islands to Bank of Hawaii. In 2002 Bank of Hawaii, which was undoing its strategy of acquiring banks in the Pacific, was unable to find a buyer for its shares. Bank of Hawaii then simply gave its 51% stake in NBSI to the Solomon Islands government. Until BSP bought NBSI, the people of Solomon Islands indirectly owned the bank through four trusts: National Provident Fund (NPF), which owned 49%, and three other trusts, the NBSI Health and Welfare Trust, NBSI Education Trust, and NBSI Employees Trust, each of which owned 17%.

In 2003, widespread public unrest over the failure of a pyramid investment scheme forced ANZ to hire a charter jet to fly its expatriate bank officials to Melbourne. Westpac, National Bank of Solomon Islands, and the Solomon Islands central bank closed their branches. Eventually. all four reopened.

On 27 April 2007, Bank South Pacific made a formal announcement to the Port Moresby Stock Exchange that it had wholly acquired NBSI. NBSI now operates as Bank South Pacific, with operations in the Solomon Islands, Fiji, and Papua New Guinea. On 29 January 2015, BSP entered into an agreement to acquire Westpac's banking operations in Samoa, Cook Islands, Solomon Islands, Vanuatu and Tonga for A$125 million.
