= Colonial National Bank =

Bank in Fiji

- Type: Public company
- Industry: Finance and Insurance
- Founded: National Bank of Fiji (1976)
- Defunct: 2009
- Fate: Acquired
- Successor: Bank South Pacific
- Headquarters: Suva, Fiji
- Products: Comprehensive and integrated range of financial products and services
- Website: www.colonial.com.fj (archive)

Colonial National Bank, was a Fiji bank that operated between 1976 and 2009 when it was purchased by the Bank South Pacific. The full name of the bank was National Bank of Fiji trading as Colonial National Bank.

In December 2009 the bank was acquired by Bank South Pacific (BSP). This gave BSP the largest branch network in Fiji. It also had a majority holding in one of the two merchant banks in the country.

== History ==
The Fijian government established the National Bank of Fiji (NBF) in 1976 on the base of the Savings Bank of Fiji, founded in 1907. After the 1987 coup, the NBF made a push to serve the indigenous Fijian population (in contradistinction to the Fijian population of Indian origin) by introducing new services, expanding its staff by hiring mainly indigenous Fijians, and increasing its lending to indigenous Fijians.

In mid-1995 NBF was running bad and doubtful debts of at least F$90 million. A year later in 1996 NBF’s bad and doubtful debts had increased to an estimated F$220million, or 8 percent of GDP. In 1998 the government split NBF into a "good bank", which it privatized, and a "bad bank", which took over the non-performing loans. The government essentially raided the national provident fund to fund the bad bank.

In 1999 the financial services group, Colonial Ltd, acquired 51% of National Bank of Fiji, which it renamed Colonial National Bank. In 2000 Colonial Ltd. merged with the Australian Commonwealth Bank. On 27 January 2006 the Commonwealth Bank acquired the remaining 49% stake in Colonial National Bank from the Fiji government.

As of December 2009 Papua New Guinea's Bank South Pacific made a complete acquisition of Colonial National from the Commonwealth Bank. In the proceeding months Colonial National was re-brand as a branch of BSP.

== Sources ==
- R. Grynberg, D. Munro & M. White. 2002. CRISIS: Collapse of the National Bank of Fiji. USP Book Centre.
