= State Savings Bank Building =

Historic building at Martin Place, Sydney, Australia

State Savings Bank building
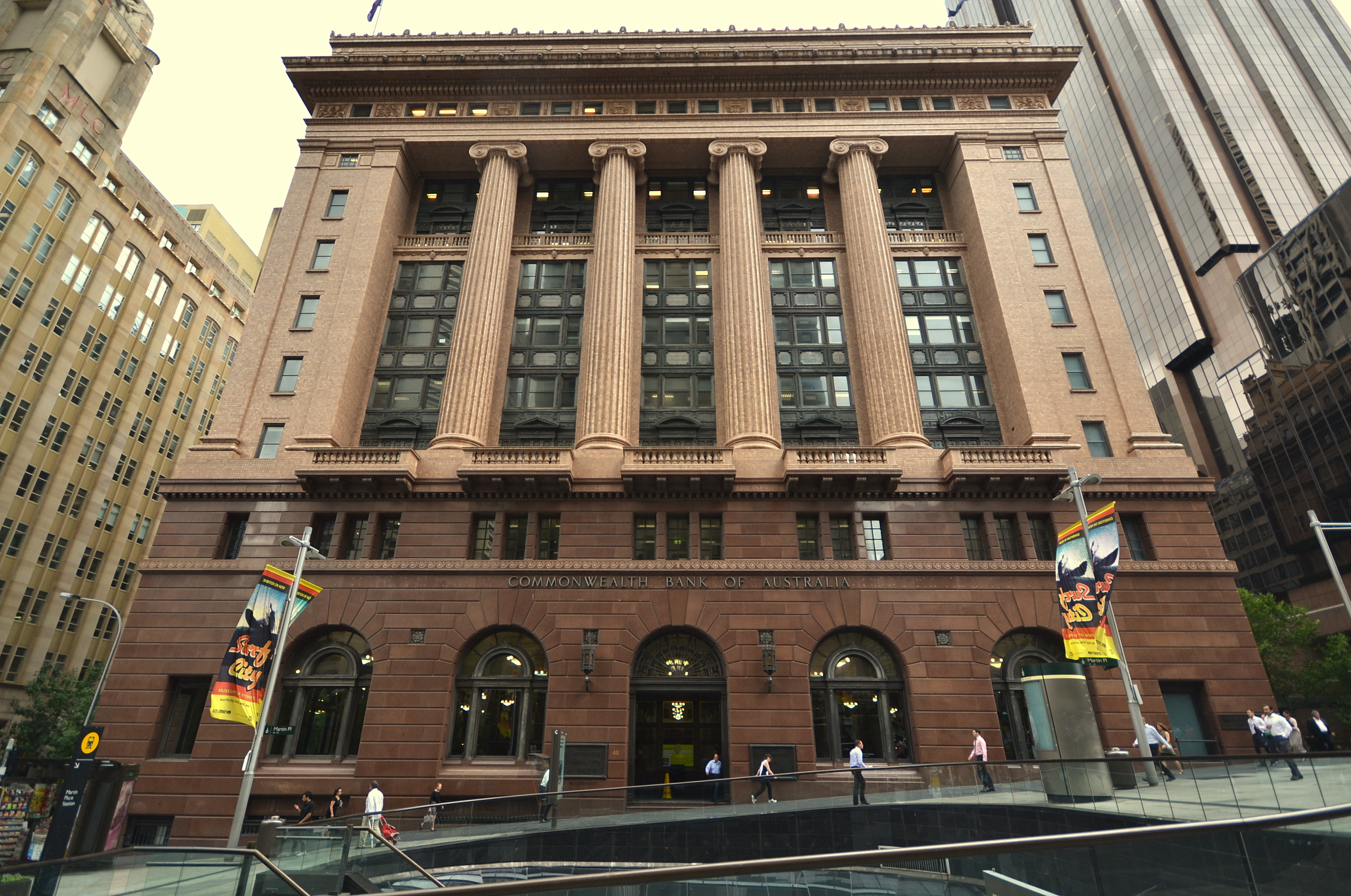
- Main façade on Martin Place

- Location within Sydney
- Former names: Government Savings Bank of New South Wales headquarters; Commonwealth Savings Bank building
- Alternative names: Money Box building

General information
- Status: Completed
- Type: Commercial offices
- Architectural style: Inter-War Beaux-Arts
- Location: Sydney CBD, 48-50 Martin Place, Sydney, New South Wales, Australia
- Coordinates: 33°52′03″S 151°12′37″E
- Groundbreaking: 13 March 1922
- Construction started: 1922
- Opened: 13 December 1928
- Renovated: September 2014
- Cost: £1,515,917
- Owner: Macquarie Bank

Height
- Height: 204 feet (62 m)

Technical details
- Floor count: 10
- Floor area: 330,000 square feet (31,000 m^{2})
- Grounds: 32,560 square feet (3,025 m^{2})

Design and construction
- Architects: Herbert E Ross & H Ruskin-Rowe
- Architecture firm: Ross & Rowe
- Main contractor: Concrete Constructions Ltd

Renovating team
- Architects: Paul van Ratingen and Matthew Morel, Johnson Pilton Walker
- Renovating firm: BVN Architecture
- Engineer: Arup Group
- Structural engineer: Taylor Thomson Whitting
- Quantity surveyor: MBM
- Main contractor: Multiplex
- Awards: Harry Seidler Award for Commercial Architecture (2015); Master Builders Association - Outstanding Construction Award, Restoration of a Historic Building (2015); AIA National Architecture Awards (2015); AIA Sir Arthur G Stephenson Award for Commercial Architecture (2015); Australian Institute of Architects- National Award

New South Wales Heritage Register
- Official name: Commonwealth Bank; The Government Savings Bank of New South Wales; CBA Building
- Type: State heritage (built)
- Designated: 17 November 2000
- Reference no.: 1427
- Type: Bank
- Category: Commercial

The State Savings Bank Building (also known as The Government Savings Bank of New South Wales building or Commonwealth Bank building) is a heritage-listed large bank building and commercial offices situated at 48–50 Martin Place, in the Sydney central business district in the City of Sydney local government area of New South Wales, Australia. It was designed by Ross & Rowe Architects and Consulting Engineers and built between 1925 & 1928 by Concrete Constructions Ltd. The building is the "pink palace" version of the money box issued by Commonwealth Bank. After several decades of use by the Commonwealth Bank of Australia, including as its headquarters from 1984, it was purchased by financial services company Macquarie Group in 2012, refurbished, and now serves as Macquarie's global headquarters as 50 Martin Place. It was added to the New South Wales State Heritage Register on 17 November 2000.

== History ==
=== Government Savings Bank of New South Wales HQ (1920 – 1931) ===
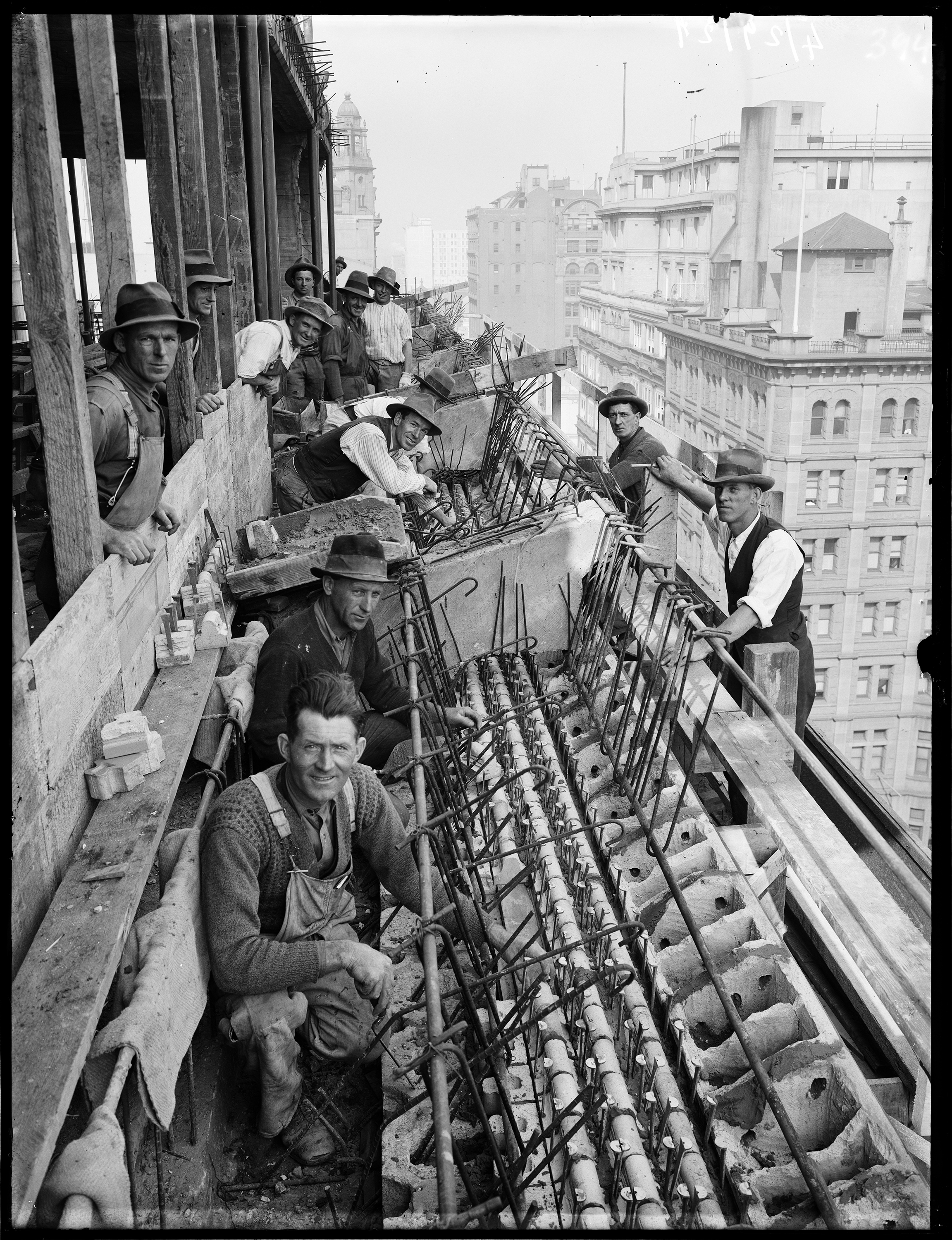
State Savings Bank Building during construction, Martin Place, 1926–27.

The successful growth and development of the Government Savings Bank of NSW over several decades necessitated relocating the operation to larger premises capable of not only accommodating the current requirements but also future ones. Between 29 November 1920 and 21 September 1921 the Commissioners of the Bank purchased five adjoining strips of land (comprising seven properties) between Castlereagh and Elizabeth Streets. The properties had frontages of 85 metres (280 ft) to both streets and a total cost of £298,500.

The eventual dimensions of the amalgamated site were 45 metres (148 ft) to Martin Place on the south, 59 metres (194 ft) to Elizabeth Street on the east and 63 metres (207 ft) to Castlereagh Street on the west. In addition to its potential for development at the required scale, the site was undoubtedly favoured for its proximity to an established civic district and central location amidst the emerging retail and financial districts of the City following World War I. It was during the Bank's administration of W. H. O'Malley Wood (President) and H. D. Hall and J. H. Davies (Commissioners) that 48 Martin Place was erected. During a ceremony on 13 March 1922, three foundation stones for the building were laid by The Hon. James Dooley MLA – Premier of New South Wales, The Hon. J. T. Lang MLA – Colonial Treasurer, and Mr O'Malley Wood – President of the Bank. Construction eventually commenced in February 1925 and 48 Martin Place was completed late in 1928.

The Government Savings Bank of NSW officially opened by the Premier of New South Wales, the Hon, T. R. Bavin, on 13 December 1928. The roof provided panoramic views over the harbour and the city in 1928, and the whole building symbolised the optimism and forward thinking of the 1920s prior to the great Depression, in addition to the prestige, security and strength of the Bank. The location, size and grandeur of the building confirmed a belief in the stability and endurance of the Australian economy in general, and the distinguished place of New South Wales in that development in particular. At the time of its construction, the building was the most expensive in Australia, having been constructed at a cost of £1,500,000.

=== Commonwealth Bank of Australia Main Sydney Branch (1931 – 1984) ===
During the Great Depression of the 1930s, the Government Savings Bank of NSW collapsed and was merged with Commonwealth Bank. On 16 December 1931, the grandiose banking chamber of the building then became the main Sydney CBD branch and the offices on the upper floors were occupied by the Australian Taxation Office.

=== Commonwealth Bank of Australia HQ (1990 – 2007) ===
Recognising the importance of 48 Martin Place, the Commonwealth Bank commissioned Australian Construction Services (part of Commonwealth Government Department of Administrative Services) late in 1980 to develop proposals for the conservation and upgrading of the building. Various building elements, in particular the facade, were examined over several subsequent years. Research also included the removal of one window of each type from the south-east corner of the building to investigate the method of detailing and the condition of the metal and working mechanisms.

Following the relocation of the Commonwealth Taxation Department in 1983, who had occupied the floors above the Banking Chamber since the 1930s, the Commonwealth Bank took the opportunity to engage in a major restoration project for this notable city property. After a series of feasibility and design studies were undertaken by Australian Construction Services, with input from Mr Peter Freeman of the Australian Heritage Commission, the Commonwealth Bank decided, in early 1984, to make 48 Martin Place Head Office for the organisation. The restoration programme was undertaken in three stages between 1984 and 1990:

1. Stage One: Internal demolitions, scaffolding and hoarding, and asbestos removal;
2. Stage Two: Major works of restoration, reconstruction and refurbishment, internal construction and services installation;
3. Stage Three: Final interior fitout and finishing.

In 2012, CBA moved their headquarters to Darling Harbour, split across Darling Park Tower One and Commonwealth Bank Place, and sold 48 Martin Place and the adjoining 9-19 Elizabeth Street building to Macquarie Bank for about A$150 million

=== Macquarie Bank HQ (2014 – current) ===
The building was purchased by Australian financial services company Macquarie Bank in March 2012 along with an adjoining building, with suggestions that the State Savings Bank building itself might be refurbished and on-sold. Instead, Macquarie refurbished the building spending A$100 million to accommodate some of its 14,000 staff adding a new three-storey glass elliptical dome roof structure to the building, a widened atrium penetrates the office floors above as well as 2 new cylindrical central lifts.

It officially moved into the building as 50 Martin Place and it now serves as the company's global headquarters as of in September 2014.

== Description ==
The Government Savings Bank of New South Wales building fronts Martin Place on the south, Elizabeth Street on the east and Castlereagh Street on the west. The building is an extensive eleven-storey structure plus mezzanine above ground, with three basement levels. Externally the building displays monumental civic scale in the Beaux-Arts architectural style, and precise symmetrical detailing utilising classical motifs. The Classic inspiration for the building is evident in the columns used on the exterior:

- Ionic columns on the Martin Place façade,
- Corinthian columns framing the balcony doors, and
- Doric columns on the roof.

The great Ionic columns on the Martin Place façade unite the six central floors, with the remaining floors serving as base and frieze. Above the base storey, strongly expressed with red granite facing, the cladding is pink terracotta blocks arranged in small tessellated effect. Terracotta cladding is also used on the Martin Place columns. At the upper levels, ornate terracotta detailing is included on the cornice, entablature and pilaster capitals. At roof level, the building has a Classical attic storey and dentilated cornice.

48 Martin Place has tremendous civic presence, portraying an image of massive solidity. It is an example of Beaux-Arts revivalist architecture, and a visual and technical masterpiece. The style was used to express the wealth and stability of financial institutions emphasising the qualities of:

- a monumental scale expressed by giant order;
- symmetry and the sculptural treatment of the facades;
- comprehensive use of classical motifs and details (both externally and internally);
- up-to-date structural techniques allowing expansive rooms; and
- high quality materials and finishes.

Extensive conservation works have restored the principal public areas to near original condition internally. The Banking Chamber, Grand Hall and Safe Deposit area are impressive in scale and detailing and form a sequence of grand interiors.

The Banking Chamber is detailed in an extravagant neo-Classical style, displaying substantial use of marble, and scagliola on tremendous stylised columns. The banking staff occupy the central space, which features marble, bronze and glass partitions. The main entrance is from Martin Place with access available from both Castlereagh and Elizabeth Streets, and also at the northern end of the building, between the Grand Hall and the Banking Chamber. The lofty ceiling is coffered and treated in a decorative manner, achieved by use of Wunderlich pressed metal panels fixed to the concrete slab. The arrangement had been detailed to give efficient and reflected light. Large bronze lamps supply artificial light reflected off the ceiling, providing diffused general lighting.

The Grand Hall forms a pedestrian way between Castlereagh and Elizabeth Streets. A ribbed barrel dome, embellished with mosaics and stained glass panels depicting prosperous Australian industries at the time of construction, surmounts the passage. Located centrally within the Hall is the Grand Stair, a wide marble staircase with bronze grille balustrade and Queensland maple handrail. The stair converges centrally at the Government Savings Bank's Memorial Window and Tablet located on the northernmost wall. Walls of marble and the sumptuous detail create a remarkable architectural space.

The Safe Deposit area in the basement level is remarkably intact. Great barrel domes create a groined ceiling of three bays supported by marble pilasters. The ceilings are decorative, and brass pendant lights hang from the centre of each dome. Mosaic spandrels above marble walls are framed by the ceiling vaults and depict wreaths and festoons in green and red against a neutral setting. The whole is framed by a green and red leaf and berry motif on deep yellow mosaic tiles. The floors are white marble with decorative black border tiles.

While the lettable office space on the upper floors has been extensively altered, the stairways connecting the upper floors are largely intact. The stairs within the chambers are terrazzo, and balustrades are bronze with timber handrails. Original timber framed hydrant covers with frosted glazed panels and timber and brass mail chutes, no longer in use, have been retained within the stair chambers, along with the floor levels detailed in decorative tiles on the walls. Windows with deep reveals are located at each level of the stair chambers.

=== Condition ===
As at 6 July 2000, the physical condition is excellent. The archaeological potential is low.

=== Modifications and dates ===
Modifications 1928–1984

The building had no major building construction since completion in 1928. The major changes that had occurred in the building since its construction until 1984 are listed below:

- Mechanical Ventilation: Wall fans installed throughout the building. Packaged air conditioning units installed in many areas including the Banking Chamber.
- Lifts: Original lift cars and doors replaced. Marble door reveals concealed by new door frames.
- Banking Chamber: Several major changes were evident in 1984:
- Glazed lantern covered over by ceiling tiles. Glass roof replaced with corrugated steel sheeting.
- Ceiling bays covered over by ceiling tiles. Decoration painted out.
- Original lights removed from all but the perimeter zone.
- Grilles removed from all arched windows.
- Air conditioning units installed on the floor within the work area.
- Original inner entrance doors removed from the Martin Place vestibule.
- Grand Hall: Original decoration painted over and light fittings removed. Stair nosings replaced with terrazzo. Smoke ventilation system installed in the 1960s, glass roof removed and concrete slab installed.
- Office Floors: Tiled terracotta partitions removed from most areas. Original light fittings removed, and extensive surface wiring and fluorescent light fittings installed.
- Central and Northern Lightwells: White tiles removed from the walls. Glass lanterns at the base of both wells removed and framing covered.
- Level 2 Offices: Minor changes include partitioning of the original Boardroom. Original light fittings replaced.
- Level 4 Offices: Suspended ceiling installed over new services and ductwork. Tiles removed and walls rendered.
- Level 9: Caretaker's flat, dining room, kitchen and professional offices removed.
- Roof: Timber buildings introduced during World War II. Cooling towers added to serve the Banking Chamber and Level 4.

Modifications 1984–1990

A synopsis of the extensive conservation works undertaken throughout 1984-1990 is provided below:

- Façade Restoration: Hand-cleaning of the terracotta and granite, removal of masons putty and re-pointing.
- Windows: All windows replaced with new welded brass units (subsequently bronzed). Original decorative copper and brass components removed, restored and replaced in their original positions. Internal window frames of Queensland maple restored.
- Scagliola: New wall panels of scagliola introduced and original panels removed, restored and installed in new locations due to the relocation of the lifts. Scagliola applied to columns was stabilised using epoxy injected with fine hypodermic needles into deteriorated areas. Walls were hand-cleaned in-situ.
- Marble and Lift Services: Original existing marble was cleaned and repolished, and relocated in some areas, for example in the north-west lift lobby to accommodate a new lift. Both north-west and north-east lift lobby areas modified by the introduction of new shafts and developed with new marble (from local and overseas sources) to match the existing. Fire stairs and new service ducts introduced while maintaining and protecting the adjacent original fabric.
- Metalwork: Original metalwork elements including the decorative external spandrel units, Banking Chamber entablature, the balustrades, perimeter lamps and writing slopes within the Banking Chamber, external lamps adjacent the Martin Place entrance and entrance doors were removed, stripped to base metal, repaired and straightened, coloured (bronzed) and reinstalled.
- Paintwork: Decorative paintwork to match original colour schemes was newly applied to the ceiling of the Banking Chamber, the Grand Hall vaulted ribs, ceilings of the lift lobbies, the Safe Deposit Public lobby and Vault lobby and the restored original Boardroom.
- Asbestos: Asbestos removed from the ceiling spaces, floors, voids and from behind the decorative metal curtain wall panels.
- Services: Extensive new services introduced into the building, with central facilities housed in new roof buildings integrated with the original towers and colonnades. Existing roof towers restored for reuse as service towers in accordance with the original intention.
- Levels 2 & 3: Original Executive offices (Level 2) restored. Original panelling, doors and hardware on Levels 2 and 3 restored for reuse.
- Banking Chamber and Grand Hall: Banking Chamber and Grand Hall restored and adapted for contemporary banking facilities and creation of a new Foyer for the Head Office by modification of the rear counter line (reducing the counter by one full bay). Works included the restoration of the Martin Place rising bronze door and the renewal of the hydraulic system and controls, the introduction of new stairs leading to the Safe Deposit Vault and installation of bronze lights, reconstructed to match the original perimeter lights within the ceiling bays.
- Safe Deposit and Basement: Safe Deposit areas were largely preserved. A new 32 vehicle carpark was installed, accessed from the Castlereagh Street side of the upper and lower basements with a loading and servicing facility introduced.
- Atrium: Original central lightwell adapted to form an atrium extending from the roof to a garden at Level 2, where the floor has been infilled. The concrete frame was clad in polished granite, with white Carrara marble floors, and the space glazed at roof level.
- Office Floors: The large (1850m2) office floors were modified for modern office use by introduction of air conditioning, suspended ceilings, sprinklers, extensive electrical and communication services. New plant rooms, switch rooms, toilets, tea rooms and fire stairs installed. Original Queensland maple architraves restored.
- Disabled Access: Disabled access provided within a new entrance at Elizabeth Street via a ramp leading to the north-east lift lobby. Disabled toilet facilities provided on levels 1, 3 and 9.

Renovation 2014

In 2014, architects Johnson Pilton Walker along with builder Multiplex refurbished the building for Macquarie Bank.

- Added steel-framed triple-glazed two-storey domed roof
- Atrium: widened by 70%
- Lifts: addition of two cylindrical glass shuttle lifts
- Restoration of original heritage pressed metal ceilings

== Money boxes ==
After its purchase by the Commonwealth Bank in 1931, the image of the building was sometimes used on money boxes issued by the Commonwealth Bank to children. The money boxes were rectangular shape, roughly reflecting the dimensions of the bank building, and printed with the building's exterior. As a result, it is sometimes referred to as the "money box building" (although more often that nickname refers to the Commonwealth Trading Bank Building, on the corner of Pitt Street and Martin Place, which had been depicted on money boxes since 1922 and remained the image on the majority of money boxes).

== Heritage listing ==
As at 6 July 2000, The Government Savings Bank building at 48 Martin Place is culturally significant at a National level as a rare example of Inter-War Beaux-Arts architecture demonstrating outstanding technical accomplishment. It is also of exceptional local and State significance. Located at a prominent address on Martin Place, the building played an important role in the development of the economy in New South Wales during the 1920s. The building was constructed between 1925 and 1928 and is one of the most important examples of its style and type within New South Wales and Australia. 48 Martin Place is one of the finest banking institutions in Australia and the finest in New South Wales. The cultural significance of 48 Martin Place and its setting will be maintained through its association with the Commonwealth Bank of Australia.

The building was listed on the (now defunct) Register of the National Estate between 1978 until the register's abolition in 2007; and is listed on the City of Sydney local government heritage register. The Government Savings Bank building was listed on the New South Wales State Heritage Register on 17 November 2000 having satisfied the following criteria.

The place is important in demonstrating the course, or pattern, of cultural or natural history in New South Wales.

The building at 48 Martin Place represents the importance of the savings bank movement established in New South Wales, which founded the pattern for the other Colonies, and of which both the Government Savings Bank and the Commonwealth Bank were successors. 48 Martin Place is associated with prosperous industries within New South Wales at the time of its construction. Stained glass panels within the Grand Hall depict the "basic sources of wealth" as they were seen in the 1920s, which were ultimately connected to banking. The Government Savings Bank promoted thrift, playing an important role as the 'People's Bank' for the average citizen who could deposit small sums and gain interest, including children via school savings accounts. The institution operated a wide network of offices and branches throughout suburban and rural New South Wales. The Government Savings Bank is directly associated with much of the suburban development of the 1920s in New South Wales by providing home loans through the Advances for Homes Department. This assisted subsequent prosperity within the building industry and associated services. In 1931, the Government Savings Bank of New South Wales was the largest savings bank within Australia and the second largest in the British Empire.

The distinguished location, scale and majestic style of the new Head Office signified the optimism and confidence of the 1920s following World War I, the belief in the stability and endurance of the Australian economy and the pre-eminence of the Sydney CBD financial centre. The project instigated by the President and Commissioners of the Government Savings Bank was remarkable in scale and cost, providing a considerable boost to employment and the building trade in NSW in the 1920s.

The building is associated with the emergence in the 1920s of large construction companies. The project was instrumental in the expansion of Wunderlich within New South Wales, who effectively established a new Australian industry for the creation of terracotta blocks. The Government Savings Bank was directly associated with critical political and financial events of the Depression period. As a major financial institution representing small investors, the collapse of the Government Savings Bank in 1931 had a devastating effect upon the lives of ordinary citizens. The Bank was a significant and conspicuous casualty of the conflict between Federal and State governments over economic policies to relieve the Depression. The closure contributed to division within the Labor party that was brought about by the contentious policies of the New South Wales Labor government under J. T. Lang's Premiership. The collapse represented a crucial loss of confidence at a critical time in the Depression that was encouraged by media reports. Loss of confidence also arose from the dispute between Federal and State Labor governments and general fear of the policies instigated by NSW Premier Jack Lang.

Establishment of the Commonwealth Bank is associated with the philosophy of the Federal Labor government prior to World War I for state control of banking. 48 Martin Place has been consistently used as a financial centre and public banking facility, and continues to provide evidence of its associations. The restoration of the Bank between 1984 and 1990 was a significant conservation project by an important government institution, reflecting the prosperity and confidence of the banking industry during the 1980s. 48 Martin Place represents an important conservation project, enabling the revival of several trades and skills associated with the heritage industry. The building represents the ability of older buildings to maintain original functions at a time of major institutional and technological change in banking. The intactness of the original Bank building retains the ability to demonstrate the original customer service procedures and the hierarchy of the management structure. Many such features were preserved during the restoration. 48 Martin Place is an excellent example of the continuing American influence on the design of large commercial buildings in Sydney and contains many features of turn-of-the-century American financial institutions. The direct contact with American architecture is significant.

The building was commissioned by the first president of the Government Savings Bank of NSW at 48 Martin Place, W. H. O'Malley-Wood, and Commissioners H. D. Hall and J. H. Davies. The building is associated with political figures James Dooley (former Premier of NSW) and J. T. Lang (former Colonial Treasurer), who along with O'Malley-Wood laid the foundation stones in 1922. 48 Martin Place represents the finest work of the significant architectural and engineering firm of H. E. Ross and Rowe. The surviving comprehensive documentary record of the original sketch, design and construction drawings enhances the importance of this association. 48 Martin Place represents a building constructed within the final phase of use of the combined skills of architecture and engineering within the architectural profession. The building was directly associated with the firm after completion when Ross and Rowe moved their practice into the building.

The place is important in demonstrating aesthetic characteristics and/or a high degree of creative or technical achievement in New South Wales.

48 Martin Place is a good example of Beaux-Arts revivalist architecture. This building is distinguished. The façade materials are detailed in different colors that make the building distinctive amongst the significant streetscape of Martin Place. In particular, the terracotta is aesthetically distinguished not least because of its contrast to the traditional masonry materials of the surrounding buildings. The roofscape has been designed to integrate service elements with the neo-Classical design of the remainder of the building, with respect for the high visibility of the roof. Internally, the extensive use of Australian marbles and scagliola provide appeal. The building reflects the materials and wealth of natural resources available within NSW and Australia at the time of its construction. 48 Martin Place displays quality craftsmanship and quality materials throughout. The building displays civic presence through its monumentality and consistent use of classical motifs. It is prominently located over the width of an important city block.

The place has a strong or special association with a particular community or cultural group in New South Wales for social, cultural or spiritual reasons.

The State Savings Bank building is an important financial institution and Sydney has been the National Headquarters since 1913. 48 Martin Place was originally constructed as a Head Office (for the Government Savings Bank of NSW) and is significant now as the Head Office for the Commonwealth Bank, an institution of national importance. In 1990, operations were relocated from 120 Pitt Street, the original Head Office. 48 Martin Place provides evidence of the significance of banking to the community, especially in a government and business sense. The building was designed to represent the status of banking institutions in the public esteem through the instruments of government and politics, and reflected the stability and confidence of the era which were considered as an important part of banking. While the building itself remains a symbol and the importance of banking is still acknowledged, current community values and the regard for politics and large institutions in general have changed. The Martin Place Executive offices on Level 2 were designed for and originally occupied by the Commissioners and the Senior Executive Officers. The prestige of their design and location is directly connected with people who hold authority within the Bank. Social significance can be attributed to these rooms as they continue to be used by Senior Executives.

The place has potential to yield information that will contribute to an understanding of the cultural or natural history of New South Wales.

The building demonstrates superior technical accomplishment, utilising innovative and unique design and engineering features and technical innovations, including the use of terracotta blocks as permanent formwork over a majority of the façade. The Martin Place entry doors display significant technical innovation, being hydraulically operated vertical action doors housed in special cavities in the basement. The mechanical fire escape operating from Level 1 and incorporating a false sill and keystone is the only known example within Australia. The physical evidence of the mechanical fire escape, albeit retained in a non-working state, provides a major source of information. The main Safe Deposit Vault door and small-scale emergency doors employed the most up-to-date technology of the time, and have not required replacement since their installation. The technology extended to the treatment of the retracting floor around the main door, used to allow the door to swing freely for opening and closing, and also to keep it in place during the Bank's operating hours. The reinforced concrete frame was a large-scale concrete structure used relatively early within Australia. The strong rooms located within the columns display a significant degree of technical innovation. 48 Martin Place has strong associations with creative achievement within Australia and the building has lost little of its design and technical integrity. The visual/sensory appeal and landmark/scenic qualities remain as strong as they were initially. 48 Martin Place is a well documented and researched building. In addition to the original drawings, a remarkable surviving source of information, much of the research potential was investigated and recorded in the recent conservation work (1984-1990). Considering the thoroughness of the previous conservation work, the building is unlikely to yield additional information.

The place possesses uncommon, rare or endangered aspects of the cultural or natural history of New South Wales.

The Beaux-Arts style is rare in Australia, with no identifiable distribution pattern evident, and the building exhibits uncommonly rich detailing and unique use of materials. 48 Martin Place is a rare example of an early 20th century financial institution within the country, remarkable in its setting within the Martin Place streetscape and in exceptional condition. The technique of using façade terracotta as formwork and also special features such as the mechanical fire stair and Martin Place hydraulic door are rare within Australia.

== Gallery ==
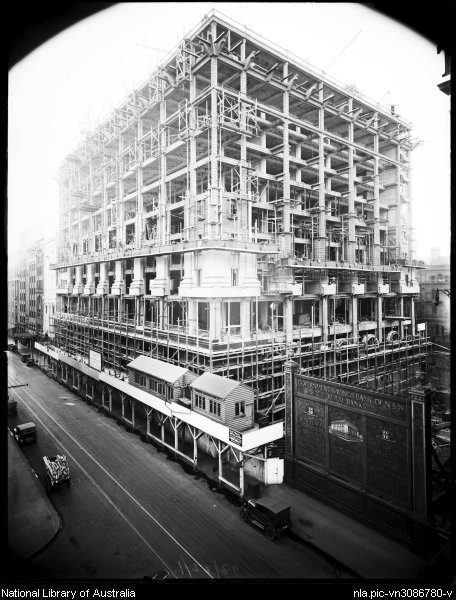
The State Savings Bank building during construction.

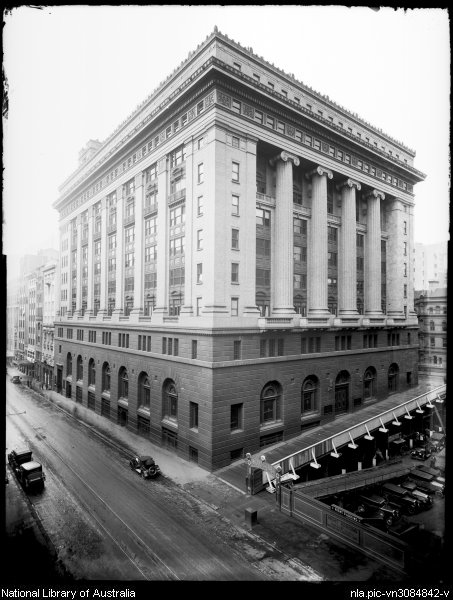
The State Savings Bank building on completion.

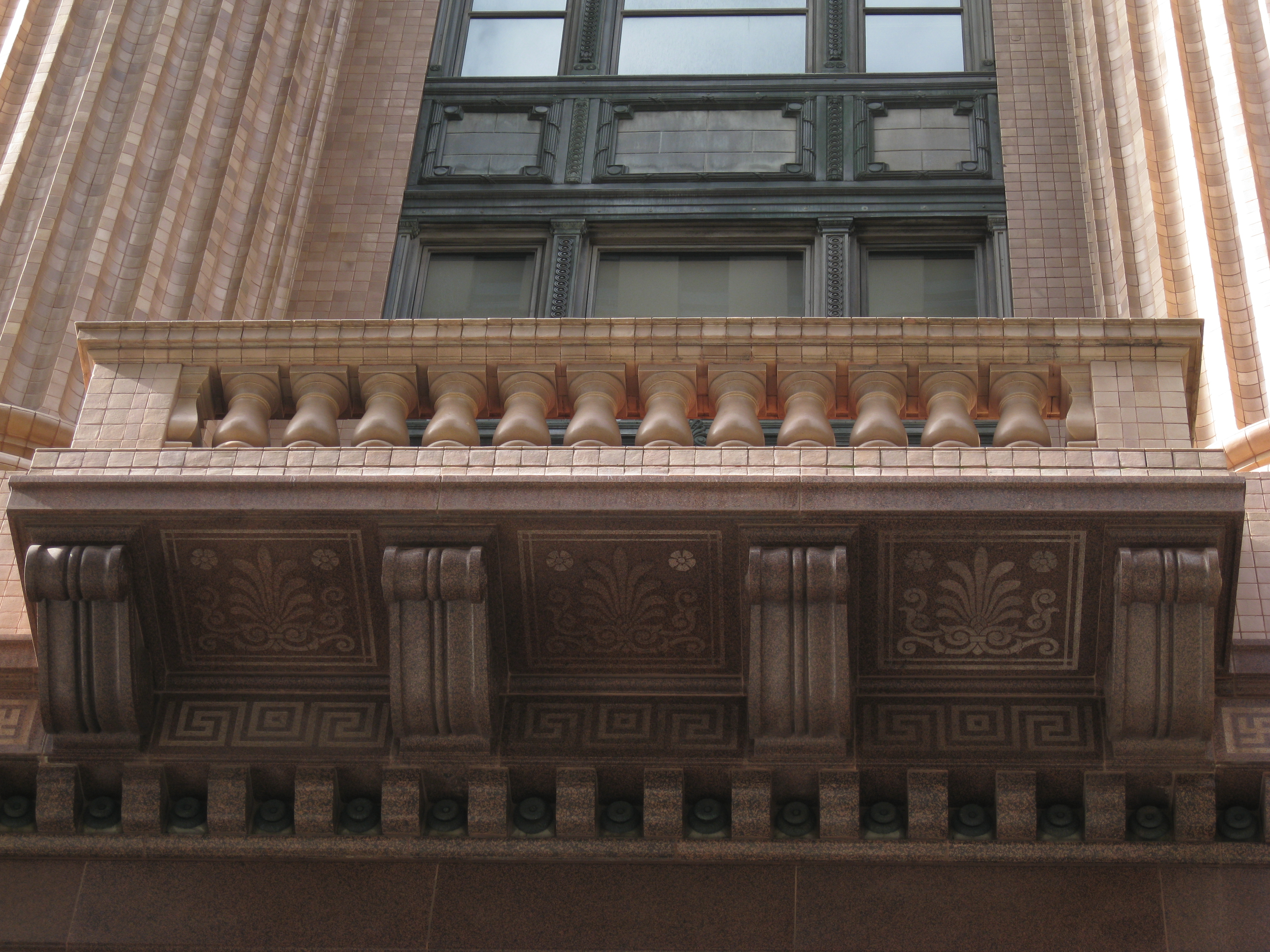
A close-up of the building's distinctive terracotta and pink granite façade.

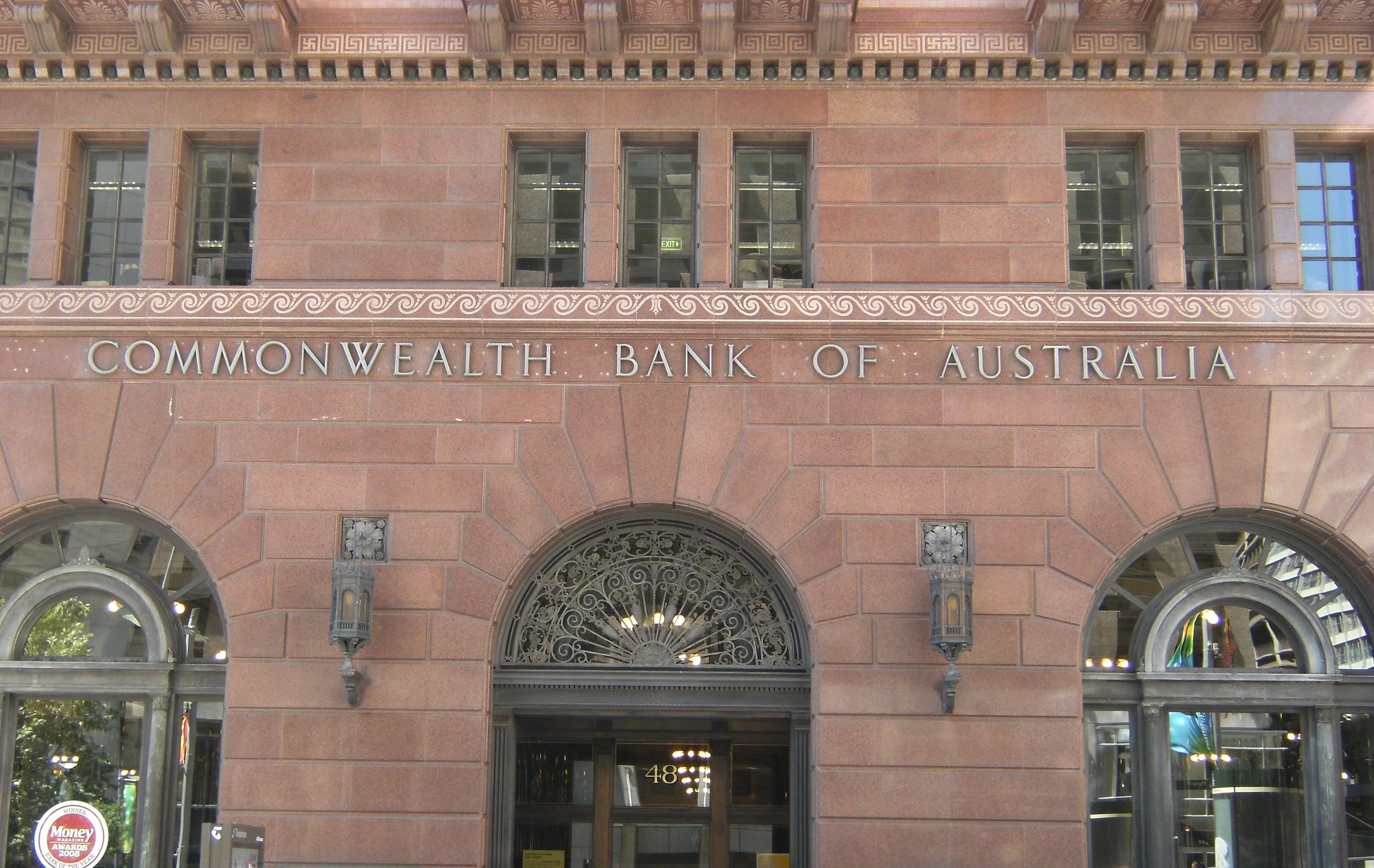
Exterior detail and signage

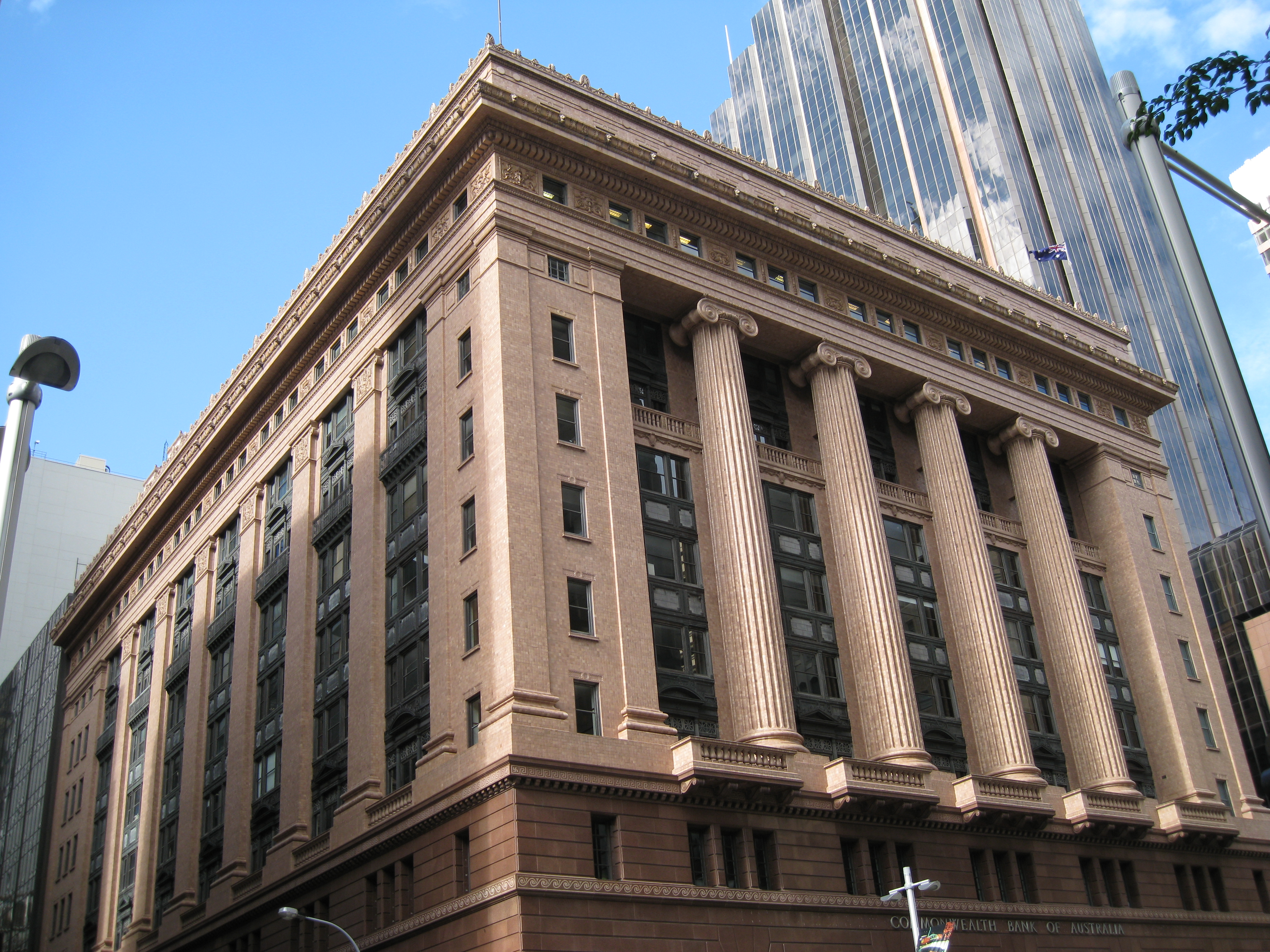
The State Savings Bank building viewed from Castlereagh Street

== See also ==
- Architecture of Sydney
- Australian non-residential architectural styles
