= Commonwealth Bank =

Australian multinational bank

Commonwealth Bank of Australia
- Symbol used since 2020

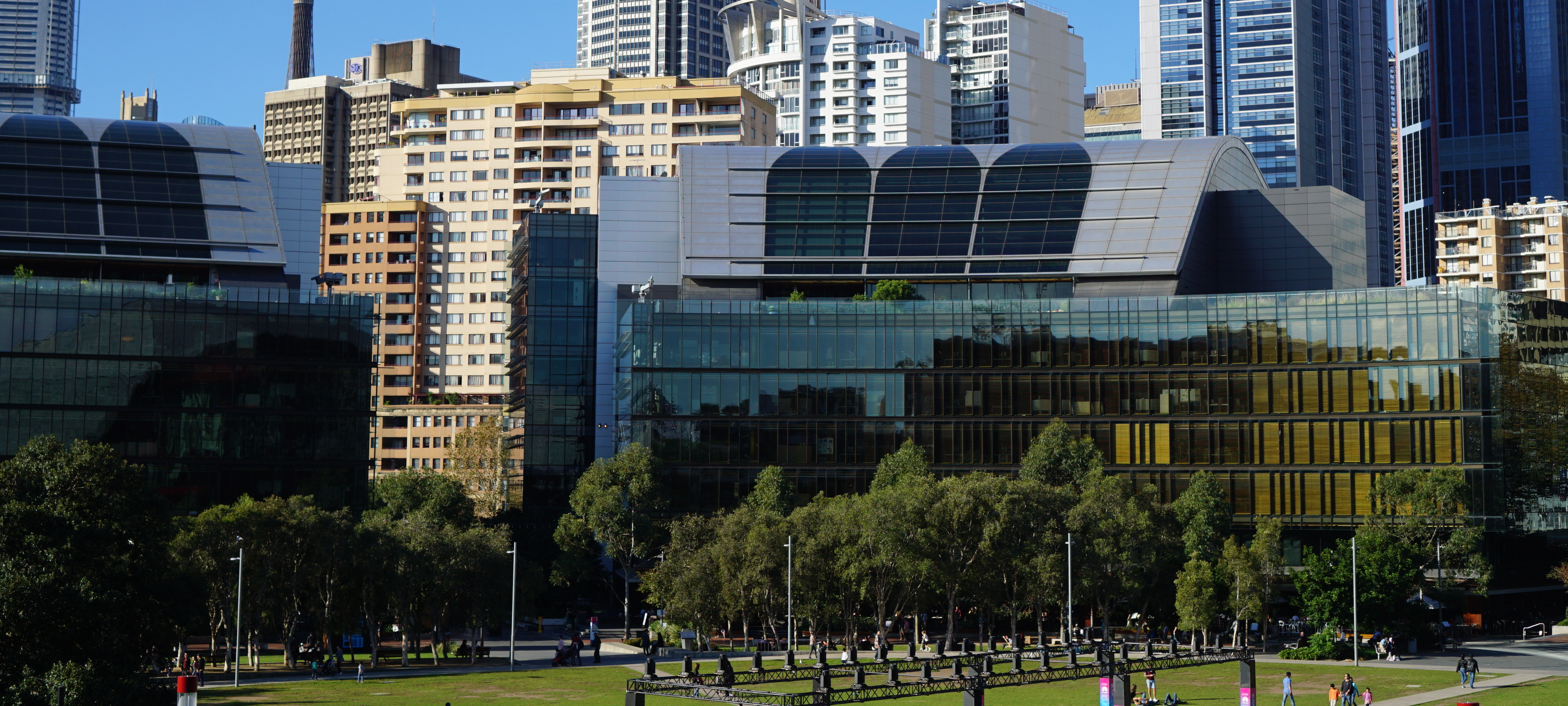
- Headquarters at Commonwealth Bank Place in Sydney
- Type: Public
- Traded as: ASX: CBA; S&P/ASX 200 component
- ISIN: AU000000CBA7
- Industry: Financial services
- Founded: 22 December 1911; 114 years ago (government bank); 12 September 1991; 35 years ago (public company)
- Headquarters: Commonwealth Bank Place South, 11 Harbour Street, Sydney, New South Wales, Australia
- Number of locations: 709 branches; 1,916 ATMs; (2024)
- Areas served: Australia; China; European Union; Hong Kong; Indonesia; Japan; London; New Zealand; New York; Singapore
- Key people: Maria Amaya (CEO)
- Products: Asset management; Banking; Commodities; Credit cards; Equities trading; Insurance; Investment management; Mortgage loans; Private equity; Wealth management
- Operating income: $51.17 billion (2024)
- Net income: $19.8 billion (2024)
- Total assets: A$6.254 trillion (2024)
- Total equity: A$73.08 billion (2024)
- Members: 17.6 million (2024)
- Number of employees: 53,000+ (2024)
- Divisions: CommBank divisions: Business Banking; Institutional Banking and Markets; Retail Banking Services
- Subsidiaries: CommBank subsidiaries: ASB Bank; Bankwest; Colonial First State; CommInsure; Commonwealth Securities; Sovereign Limited
- Capital ratio: 12.3% (2024)
- Rating: AA− (2024)
- Website: commbank.com.au

The Commonwealth Bank of Australia (CBA), also known as Commonwealth Bank or simply CommBank, is an Australian multinational bank with businesses across New Zealand, Asia, the United States and the United Kingdom. It provides a variety of financial services, including retail, business and institutional banking, funds management, superannuation, insurance, investment and broking services. The Commonwealth Bank is the largest Australian listed company on the Australian Securities Exchange as of July 2024, with brands including Bankwest, Colonial First State Investments, ASB Bank (New Zealand), Commonwealth Securities (CommSec) and Commonwealth Insurance (CommInsure). Its former constituent parts were the Commonwealth Trading Bank of Australia, the Commonwealth Savings Bank of Australia and the Commonwealth Development Bank.

Founded in 1911 by the Australian government and fully privatised in 1996, the Commonwealth Bank is one of the big four Australian banks, along with the National Australia Bank (NAB), ANZ and Westpac. The bank was listed on the Australian Stock Exchange on 12 September 1991.

The former global headquarters of Commonwealth Bank were the Commonwealth Trading Bank Building on the corner of Pitt Street and Martin Place, Sydney, which was refurbished from 2012 for retail and commercial uses, and (from 1984 to 2012) the State Savings Bank Building on Martin Place, which was sold in 2012 to Macquarie Bank. The headquarters were then moved, splitting between two locations; Tower 1 of 201 Sussex Street and the Commonwealth Bank Place; a new complex of two nine-storey buildings in Darling Harbour on the western side of Sydney's city centre. In 2022, the headquarters were consolidated into the Commonwealth Bank Place, with Tower 1 of 201 Sussex Street remaining as a secondary head office.

In 2018, findings from the Royal Commission into Misconduct in the Banking, Superannuation and Financial Services Industry indicated a negative culture within the bank, amid allegations of fraud, deception and money laundering, among various other crimes.

In 2022, the Commonwealth Bank held the 49th position in the "Top 1000 World Banks". As of August 2024 it is listed as the 66th-largest company in the world by market cap.

== History ==
=== Foundation (1911–1919) ===
The Commonwealth Bank of Australia was established by the Commonwealth Bank Act 1911, introduced by the Andrew Fisher Labor government, which favoured bank nationalisation, with effect on 22 December 1911. In a rare move for the time, the bank was to have both savings and general bank business. The bank was also the first bank in Australia to receive a federal government guarantee. The bank's earliest and most strenuous proponent was the flamboyant American-Australian Labor politician King O'Malley, and its first governor was Sir Denison Miller.

The bank opened its first branch in Melbourne on 15 July 1912. In an agreement with Australia Post that exists to this day, the bank also traded through post office agencies. In 1912, it took over the State Savings Bank of Tasmania, and by 1913 it had branches in all six states.

In 1916, the bank moved its head office to Sydney. It also followed the Australian army into New Guinea, where it opened a branch in Rabaul and agencies elsewhere.

=== Central bank (1920–1959) ===
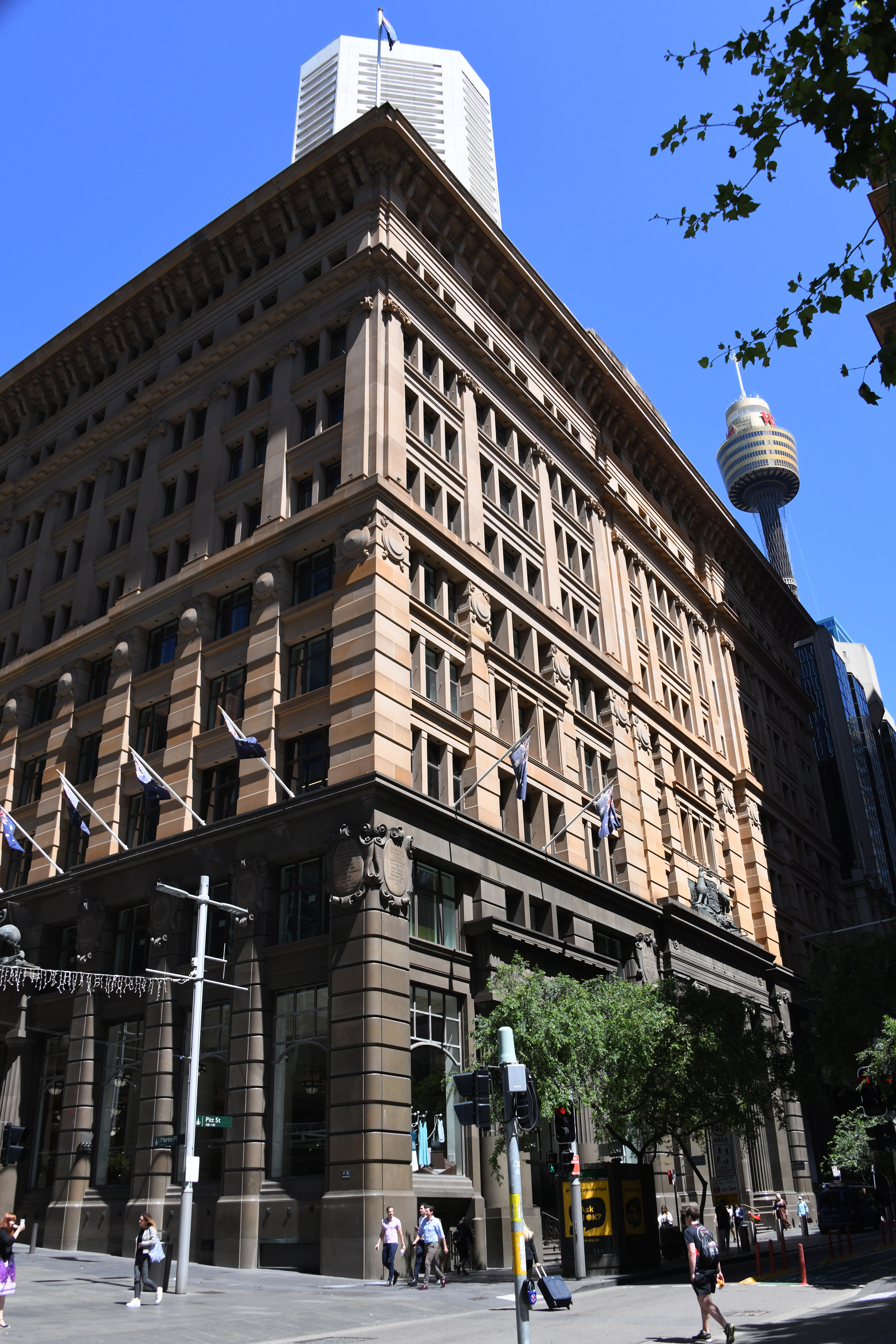
The Commonwealth Trading Bank Building (1916-1960)

In 1920, the bank began acquiring central bank powers when it took over the responsibility for the issue of Australian bank notes from the Department of the Treasury. Also in 1920, the Commonwealth Bank took over the Queensland Government Savings Bank.

In 1924, the federal government of Stanley Bruce sought to place further checks and limits on the powers of the governor of the bank, and passed the Commonwealth Bank Act, 1924, which created a seven-member Board of Directors comprising the governor, the Secretary of the Treasury, and six directors "actively engaged in agriculture, commerce, finance or industry", and a Chairman of the Board elected annual from its members. The first six board members were appointed on 10 October 1924: Sir John Garvan, Sir Robert Gibson, Sir Samuel Hordern, Robert McComas, Richard Samuel Drummond and John McKenzie Lees. Garvan was appointed as the first chairman on 13 October 1924.

In 1931, the bank board came into conflict with the Labor government of James Scullin. The bank's chairman Sir Robert Gibson refused to expand credit in response to the Great Depression, as had been proposed by Treasurer Edward Theodore unless the government cut pensions, which Scullin refused to do. The conflict surrounding this issue led to the fall of the government, and to demands from Labor for reform of the bank and more direct government control over monetary policy.

Also in 1931, it took over the savings bank business of the Government Savings Bank of New South Wales (est. 1871), the current account and fixed deposit business of the NSW Rural Bank Department, and the State Savings Bank of Western Australia (est. 1863).

In 1942, the Commonwealth Banking Corporation (CBC) suspended its operations in Papua New Guinea as the Imperial Japanese Army captured many of the towns in which it operated, and bombed Port Moresby. The bank resumed operations later, possibly in 1944.

The bank had many branches across Papua New Guinea including Port Moresby, Boroko, Rabaul, Lae, Wau, Bulolo, Goroka, Kavieng, Madang, Mount Hagen, Kundiawa, Popondetta and Wewak. On Bougainville, there was Kieta, Panguna, Arawa and early on a part-time sub-branch at Loloho. It maintained those facilities to support trade, local business, government and small savers.

The Commonwealth Bank received almost all central bank powers in emergency legislation passed during World War II and at the end of the war, it used this power to begin a dramatic expansion of the economy. This was also the aim of the federal government at the time, which attempted to compel the Australian states to conduct their banking with the Commonwealth under the Banking Act 1945 (Cth), but the High Court in Melbourne Corporation v Commonwealth (1947) 74 CLR 31, blocked this move.

In August 1945, the federal government of Ben Chifley passed the Commonwealth Bank Act, 1945, which repealed the 1925 act and abolished the Board of Directors, returning full executive control of the bank to the governor.

The government also dramatically expanded immigration programs. In response, the bank established a Migrant Information Service (later known as the Australian Financial & Migrant Information Service, or AFMIS). The bank expanded during this period, and in just five years it opened hundreds of branches throughout Australia and in 1951 it established a branch in the Solomon Islands.

In 1958 and 1959, there was a controversy concerning the dual functions of the organization, operating as the central bank on the one hand and a commercial bank on the other. As a result, the government separated the two roles, creating the Reserve Bank of Australia to exercise the central bank function, and leaving the Commonwealth Banking Corporation to operate purely as a commercial bank. Those commercial functions were exercised by the organization's constituent sections: the Commonwealth Trading Bank of Australia, the Commonwealth Savings Bank of Australia, and the newly formed Commonwealth Development Bank.

From 1958 to 1976 the Commonwealth Bank operated savings bank agencies in the New Hebrides.

=== Diversification (1960–1991) ===
A new Commonwealth Development Bank was established in 1960 and during the 1970s the bank diversified its business into areas like insurance and travel. It established a finance company, CBFC in 1974. The bank also became more heavily involved in foreign currency trading and international banking in general.

The bank actively supported the introduction of decimal currency in the years leading up to 1966 and, like most banks, it gradually converted its paper records onto a new computer-based system. The bank created the first credit card in Australia in 1974 when it established Bankcard. In later years the bank began offering MasterCard (1984) and Visa (1993) cards as well.

In 1974, as Papua New Guinea approached independence, the bank formally handed over its PNG operations to the newly created and government-owned Papua New Guinea Banking Corporation (PNGBC). The bank retained a restricted branch in Port Moresby that it finally closed in 1982.

In 1981 the bank transferred its operations in the Solomon Islands to the National Bank of Solomon Islands, which operated as a joint venture (51% Commonwealth Bank, 49% Government of the Solomon Islands).

In 1989 the bank acquired 75 per cent of ASB Bank in New Zealand.

In 1991 the bank acquired the failing state government-owned State Bank of Victoria.

=== Privatisation (1991–present) ===
Logo used until 2020

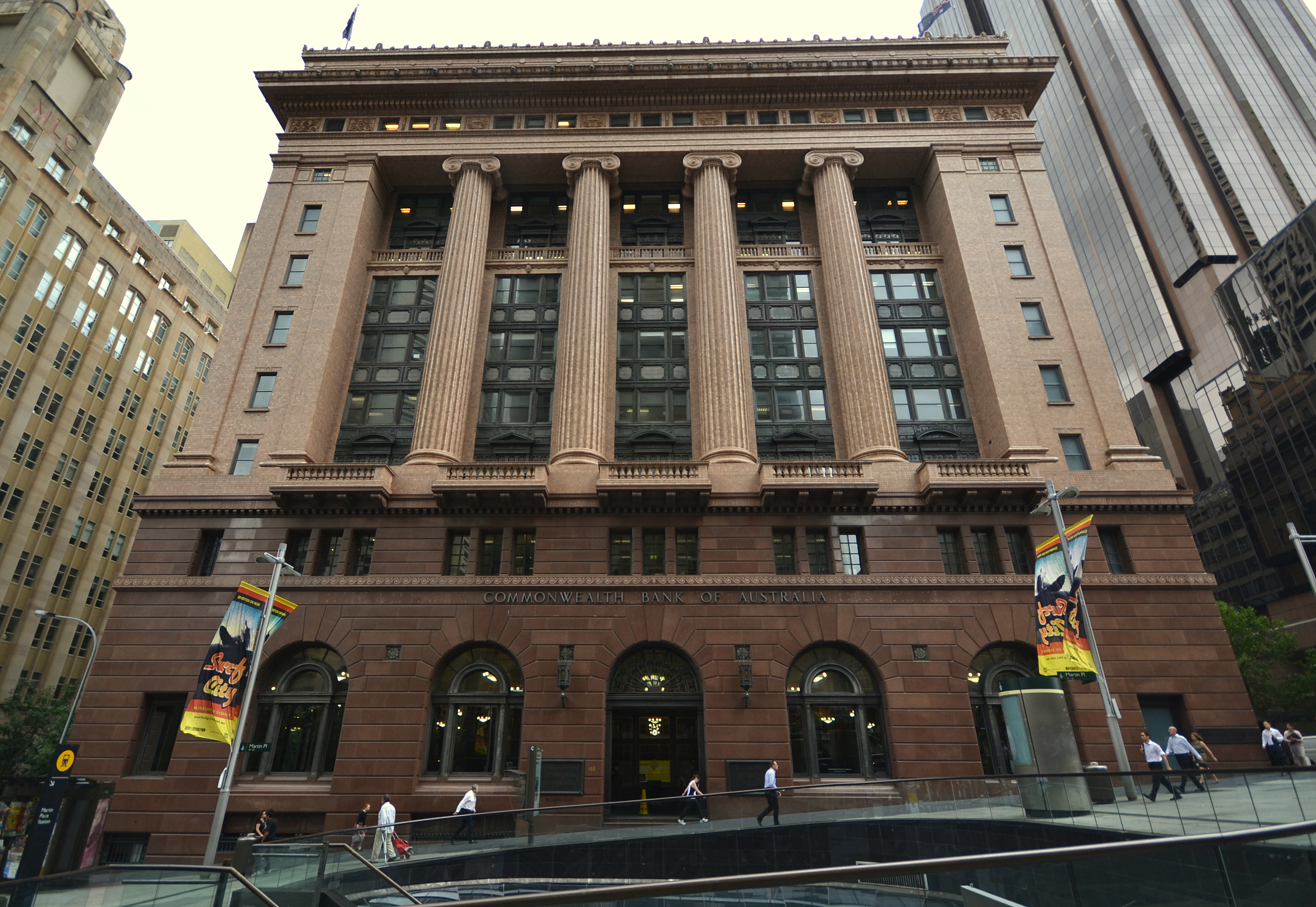
48 Martin Place; the Commonwealth Bank's headquarters from 1990 to 2009

Between 1991 and 1996 the Australian government under the leadership of prime minister Paul Keating fully privatised the Commonwealth Bank. The first share offer in 1991 was valued at $1,292 million, the second in 1993 for $1.7 billion and the third was sold for $5 billion in 1996. It is a public company, but one of the few such companies in Australia whose official name does not end in 'Limited'.

In 1994 Commonwealth sold its shares in National Bank of Solomon Islands to Bank of Hawaii. In 1994, Commonwealth took a 50% share in PT Bank International Indonesia.

On 10 March 2000, the Commonwealth Bank and Colonial Limited announced their intention to merge, with seven Commonwealth Bank shares being offered for twenty Colonial Shares. The merger received final approval from the Supreme Court of Victoria on 31 May 2000 and was completed on 13 June 2000. This brought into the fold Colonial's stake in Colonial National Bank, the former National Bank of Fiji. The bank also acquired the remaining 25% of ASB Bank.

Asian banking opportunities in 2000, saw the bank acquire full ownership of PT Bank International Indonesia and rename it (PT Bank Commonwealth). This bank now has over 16 branches and has opened several FX shops to cater to Commonwealth Bank clients who are tourists in Bali.

In 2005, the bank established strategic co-operation agreements with two Chinese banks, Jinan City Commercial Bank and Hangzhou City Commercial Bank; it took an 11% stake in Jinan Commercial, and a 19.9% stake in Hangzhou Commercial. Commonwealth also established a representative office in Bangalore, India.

On 27 January 2006, the bank acquired the remaining 49% stake in Colonial National Bank (Fiji).

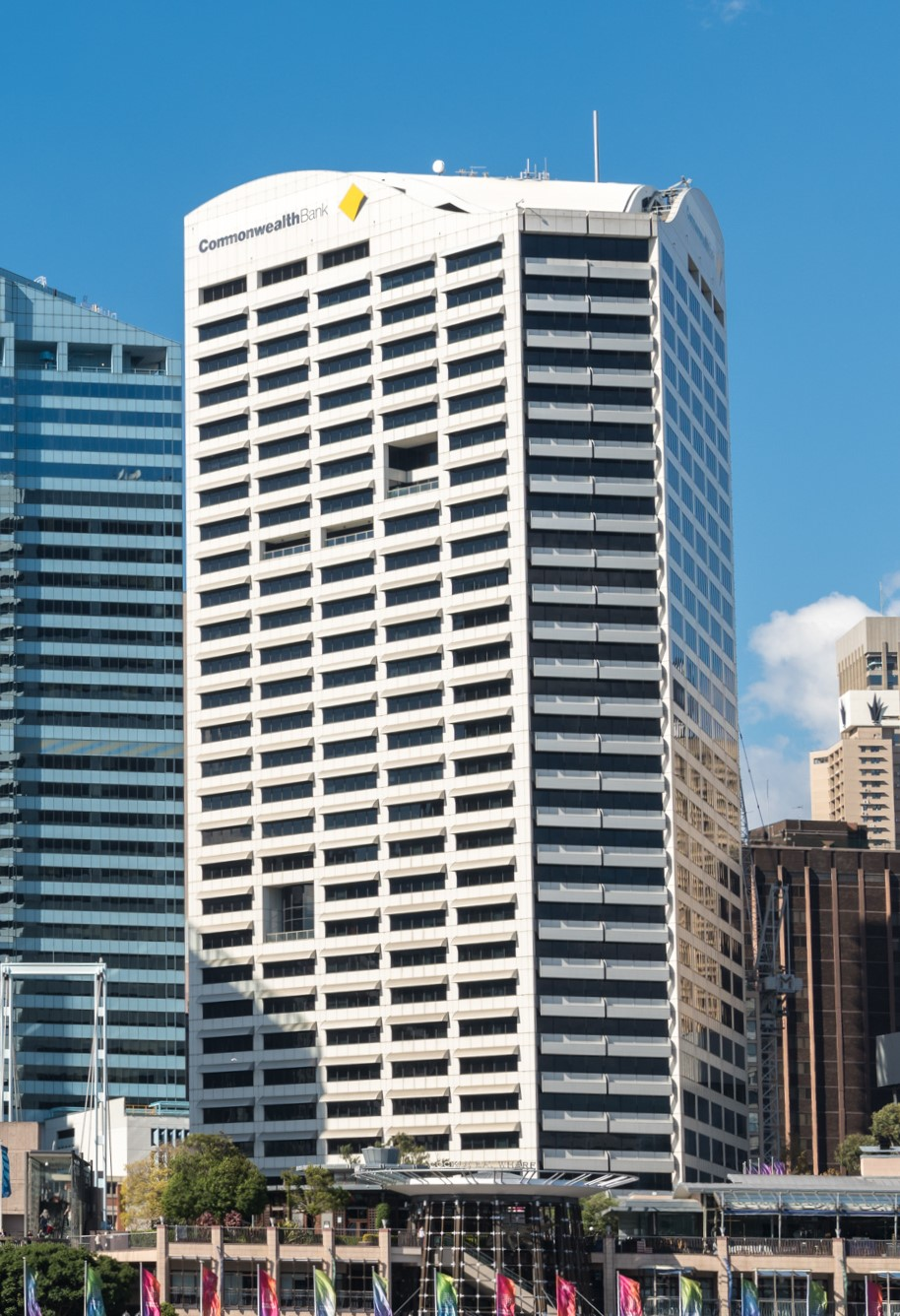
Tower 1, 201 Sussex Street; headquarters from 2010 to 2022 and now a secondary head office

At the beginning of 2008, Commonwealth Bank opened a branch in Ho Chi Minh City (Saigon). Then in October, Commonwealth announced that it had purchased Bankwest and St Andrew's Insurances from their parent company HBOS for A$2.1 billion. The acquisition was scheduled to be completed in early 2009, subject to regulatory approval. Lastly, on 24 December, Commonwealth announced that it had, in joint partnership with Aussie Home Loans, purchased Wizard Home Loans. As part of the deal, the Commonwealth Bank will acquire Wizard mortgages up to the value of A$4 billion. Commonwealth Bank held about 30 per cent of the loan business of financial advisory company Storm Financial when it collapsed in January 2009.

In December 2009, Commonwealth sold Colonial National Bank to Bank of South Pacific.

The bank transferred its ATM service desk from HP Enterprise Services in Adelaide to ITS (Armaguard) in Sydney in March 2012. The bank will change from NCR and Diebold ATMs to Wincor Nixdorf ATMs over the coming years.

The bank is the only financial services organisation to appear in the Dream Employers' top 20 list of preferred employers for 2010 and 2011.

During the Royal Commission into Misconduct in the Banking, Superannuation and Financial Services Industry it was discovered that the Commonwealth Bank had charged dead people for financial advice services. On 9 May 2018, Commonwealth Bank settled an interest rate rigging case brought by ASIC for $25 million. In the settlement, the bank admitted it engaged in "unconscionable conduct" and manipulated the bank bill swap rate five times between February and June 2012.

On 16 November 2023, the bank announced divestment of PT Bank Commonwealth to Bank OCBC NISP.

== Controversies ==
=== Environmental ===
Commonwealth Bank is one of the major Australian banks known to be financing and profiting from activities destructive to the Great Barrier Reef, something the bank has been facing increased public scrutiny over since a 2013 report by Market Forces; the Sydney Morning Herald stated:

Australia's big four banks are leading lenders to the massive expansion in coal and gas shipments through the Great Barrier Reef, contradicting their own pledges to curb carbon emissions and preserve sensitive environmental areas. ... The CBA, meanwhile, highlighted its achievement to cut carbon emissions from operations by 35,000 tonnes in 2012. A single bulk carrier shipment of coal exported from Australia would result in final emissions of four times those savings.

— Julien Vincent, campaigner with Market Forces, May 2013.

In 2014, CBA and the big four Australian banks faced increased pressure to end their support for reef-threatening mining projects, as surveys have shown that "the big four banks would be risking customers shifting up to $236 billion in household deposits if they were to finance a project like the Abbot Point expansion".

In late 2014, it "was revealed [CBA] was advising Indian coal miner Adani on its proposed development in Queensland's Galilee basin", while by 2015, it has been reported that "all the major American and European banks have refused funds to the project, citing environmental damage".

In May 2015, a report by Market Forces showed that CBA is the single biggest lender to fossil fuel projects within the Great Barrier Reef World Heritage Area during the six-year period from 2008 to 2014. Almost immediately following, protests were held at over fifty CBA branches in Australia and around the world. Billboards, hoardings and branch signs were revised to read "Coal Bank" and company slogans changed to highlight its investment in fossil fuels.

Later in May, a report by MSCI showed that while other banks are reducing their funding for fossil fuel projects, Australia's largest banks are ramping up this same funding; The Guardian reported:

Australia's largest banks have committed about 10% of their known loan arrangements to the financing of risky fossil fuel projects that may become 'stranded' if the world is to avoid disastrous climate change, new research has estimated.

— The Guardian, May 2015.

=== 2008 financial planning scandal ===
In October 2008, former CBA financial planner Jeff Morris alleged to the Australian Securities and Investments Commission (ASIC) and subsequently a Senate Inquiry, the extent of the misconduct of CBA's financial planning arm, Commonwealth Financial Planning Limited (CFPL), but it was not until 16 months later that ASIC would launch an investigation. "There was forgery and dishonest concealment of material facts," the Senate Inquiry found in its report. They concluded a Royal Commission or Judicial Inquiry as it was deemed ASIC lacked the investigative powers required to uncover the full extent of the allegations. A week following the Senate Inquiry, CEO Ian Narev publicly apologised while announcing a compensation scheme. Former CEO Ralph Norris also conceded that he was aware of problems within CFPL acknowledging the presence of rogue financial planners but rejected the assertion of a conspiracy to cover it up. CBA has been criticised in the Senate for appointing Dr. Brendan French, who was the General Manager of Group Customer Relations before, as the head of the Open Advice Review program. The CBA defended Dr. Brendan French successfully in a defamation lawsuit in 2015; the decision was a single judge decision and was not appealed after the defence was withdrawn. Criticism has also been leveled at the fact that Dr. Brendan French was formerly a member of the board of directors of the Financial Ombudsman Service and is now working in CBA with respect to customer complaints.

=== 2016 $76m Ponzi scheme ===
In 2016, it was revealed that some CBA staff were implicated in an alleged $76m Ponzi scheme fraud. The alleged architects of the scam were professional poker player Bill Jordanou and accountant Robert Zaia.

=== Insurance division scandal ===
It was reported alleged systemic issues about the insurance division of CBA. A claimant who suffered a heart attack and nearly died had his claim declined based on an outdated medical definition in his insurance policy. The company admitted this decision was a bad judgement. The insurer also "refused to pay total permanent disability (TPD) and terminal illness claims on the chance that a dying person facing organ failure may have their life saved by a transplant, and that a person can claim their life insurance if they are declared terminally ill by two doctors and deemed likely to die within 12 months". In March 2016, ASIC announced it would be investigating CBA about the allegations. After the serious allegations were aired in an episode of Four Corners two parliamentary inquiries were conducted. One into the life insurance sector, and another into protection of whistleblowers. The inquiries found that no staff involved in the wrongdoings were fired. The only person who suffered a consequence was the whistleblower who had tried to do the right thing. There were also calls for a Royal Commission into the insurance industry. The Financial Services Royal Commission was eventually called and found widespread issues. The Commonwealth Bank was called the gold medallist for ripping off customers by the counsel assisting the royal commissioner.

=== Money laundering scandal ===
In August 2017, the financial intelligence agency Australian Transaction Reports and Analysis Centre (AUSTRAC) launched civil proceedings in the Federal Court of Australia, alleging that CBA had breached money laundering and terrorism financing laws on 53,700 occasions. The breaches related to the bank's use of intelligent deposit machines (IDMs) between November 2012 and September 2015—the bank claimed that a programming error allowed depositors to instantly credit cash deposits to their accounts, whilst failing to report amounts over $10,000 to AUSTRAC, and not enforcing any limits to the number of transactions.

=== Bank bill swap rate allegations ===
ASIC commenced legal proceedings in the Federal Court on 30 January 2018 alleging manipulation of the bank bill swap rate (BBSW). The BBSW rate is the rate of interest that banks charge to lend money to each other, and is a key interest rate used as the benchmark for interest rates on a number of products, most notably business loans, currency derivatives and floating rate bonds. It is alleged that the manipulations took place on three specific occasions in 2012.

=== BankWest commercial loan book ===
The change from Basel I to Basel II capitalisation requirements, due to take effect on 1 January 2009, required BankWest to increase its Tier 1 capital (share capital) by an additional A$17 billion. BankWest's owner HBOS lent this money to Bankwest, but required the money be repaid to meet HBOS's own capital requirements.

HBOS, therefore, agreed to sell BankWest to Commonwealth Bank (CBA) in October 2008. The sale completed on for A$2.1 billion on 19 December 2008, and required Commonwealth Bank to repay the capital HBOS had loaned Bankwest.

One of the provisions of the sale agreement was an ability for CBA to claim a price adjustment. A loan was later found to have been impaired at the time of purchase but had not been identified to Commonwealth Bank by HBOS as impaired during the acquisition.

Commonwealth Bank declared 1,958 out of 26,000 BankWest commercial loans impaired (in default of the loan terms), with a total face value of $17.9 billion. As they were deemed to be in breach of their loan conditions, the bank was able to charge increased interest rates, or require early repayment.

Commonwealth Bank lost A$2 billion on defaulted loans that were not repaid (2.1% of the loan book, in comparison to an average of 0.4% across the Big Four Australian banks). Of the defaulted loans, the calling-in of 117 resulted in the borrowing company going into receivership.

Borrowers complained that they had complied with the monetary conditions of the loans: they had kept up interest payments and repayments, and disputed whether it was reasonable to apply penalty interest and require early repayment for non-monetary issues (for example, not having invested the funds for the purpose borrowed, or no longer having adequate security to back the loan).

The Australian Parliament requested that the Parliament's Joint Committee on Corporations and Financial Services conduct an inquiry into the matter, which reported on 4 May 2016.

The committee concluded that there was no evidence to suggest that impairment of loans was related to an attempt to 'claw back' any of the BankWest purchase price. However, it did find that "in a minority of cases" there was abuse of the asymmetry of power between the bank and the borrower. The committee recommended that there be improvements in the consistency of lenders' valuation of property used as security for loans.

=== Dollarmites ===
Dollarmites was the Commonwealth Bank's school banking program. In a 2020 Report, the Australian Securities and Investments Commission (ASIC) recommended against these programs. The Victorian Government and later the Queensland Government planned to stop allowing these programs in their state schools. Consumer group Choice continued to lobby for more State governments to also ban the banking program from public schools. Finally in 2021, after the New South Wales Government banned it too, the Commonwealth Bank announced the end of the program.

A subset of Commonwealth Bank staff were found to be fraudulently use the bank's money, loose change, or their own money to illegitimately activate Youthsaver accounts for financial gain. According to The Sydney Morning Herald, "They would do so when parents had signed up their kids for school banking, often referred to as Dollarmites, but had not deposited money into the account within 30 days. If no deposit had been made, the sign-up would not count towards sales targets and financial rewards."

== Headquarters ==
Commonwealth Bank has moved through many different offices, starting off in Melbourne (Collins Street), then moving to Martin Place in Sydney's CBD. In 2009, CBA moved into Darling Park Tower 1. During the Sydney COVID-19 lockdown in 2020–2022, CBA moved staff into their new offices, CBP North, and CBP South (Commonwealth Bank Place North and South), on Harbour Street, near Tumbalong Park. In October 2023, CBA occupied levels 14 to 21, and 27 of DP1 (Darling Park Tower 1). By the end of 2023, CBA moved the remaining staff from levels 14 to 21 out of DP1.

As of November 2025, all Commonwealth Bank staff members work out of CBP South, CBP North, The Foundry (Redfern, NSW), Axel (Redfern, NSW), or CBS (Commonwealth Bank Square), with the exception of the remaining staff in DP1.

== Bank structure ==
=== Customer Service Network ===
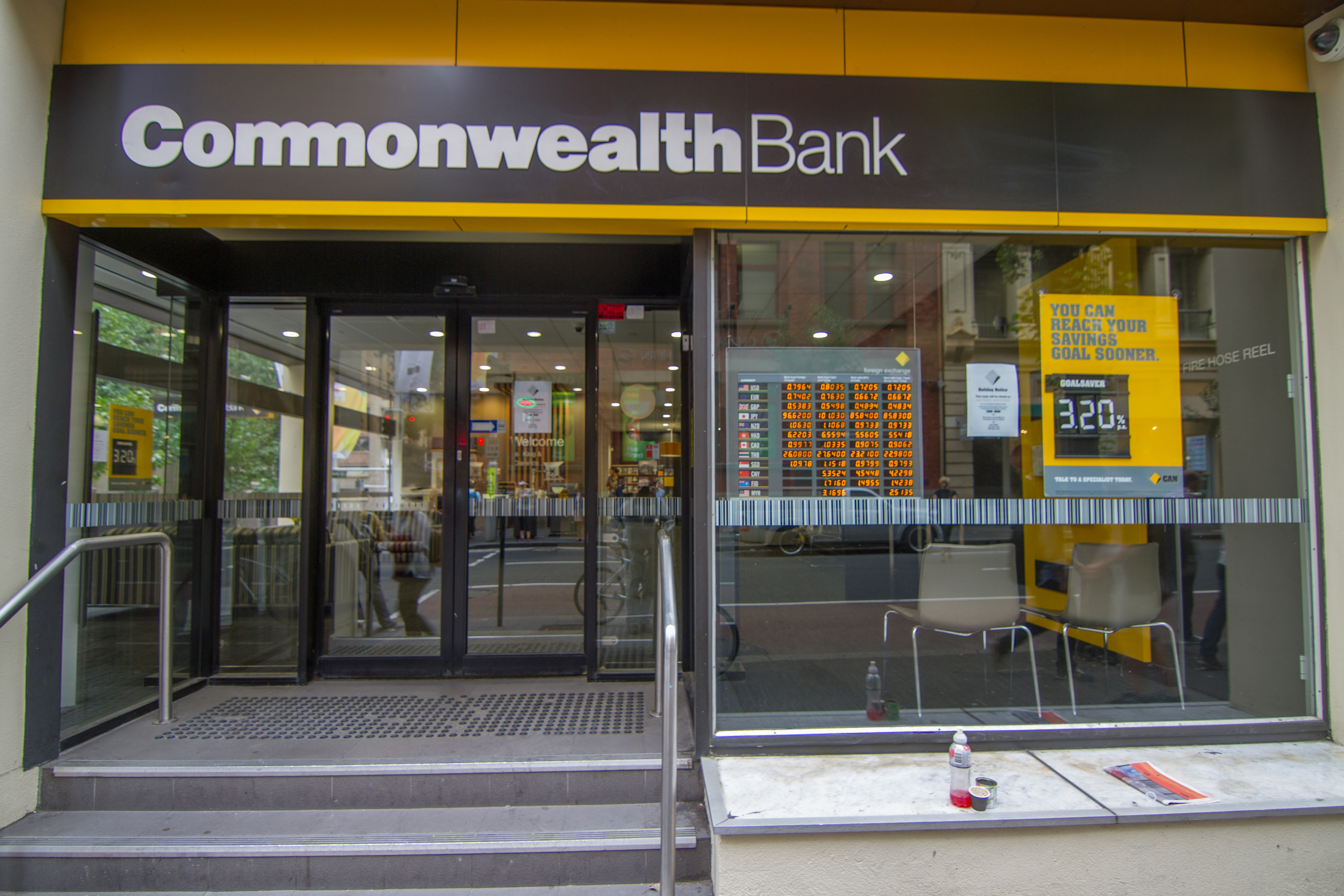
A Commonwealth Bank branch office

This division delivers financial services to personal and small business customers. It provides bank accounts and credit products to consumers.

=== Premium Business Services ===
Premium Business Services was formally split into two departments in 2009, Institutional Banking & Markets (IB&M) and Business & Private Banking (B&PB). IB&M includes areas of the bank that provides services to Institutional Clients and Global Markets. B&PB includes areas of the bank that provides services to Business customers and private banking customers.

=== Wealth Management ===
Wealth Management brings together the Groups funds management platform, master funds, superannuation, insurance and financial advice business support. Colonial First State, Colonial First State Global Asset Management and CommInsure all form part of Wealth Management. CBA has been granted a MySuper authority, enabling it to continue to receive default superannuation contribution from 1 January 2014.

== Executive leadership ==
=== Governors/Chief Executive Officers ===
The following individuals have been appointed to serve as chief executive of the Commonwealth Bank of Australia, or precursor titles:

Order	Name	Title	Term start	Term end	Time in office
1	Sir Denison Miller	Governor	June 1912	June 1923	11 years, 29 days
2	James Kell	Governor	June 1923	October 1926	3 years, 122 days
3	Sir Ernest Riddle	Governor	October 1926	February 1938	11 years, 121 days
4	Sir Harry Sheehan	Governor	March 1938	March 1941	3 years, 0 days
5	Hugh Traill Armitage	Governor	July 1941	December 1948	7 years, 183 days
6	H. C. Coombs	Governor	January 1949	January 1960	11 years, 0 days
7	Ernest Richardson	Managing Director	January 1960	March 1965	5 years, 89 days
8	Sir Bede Callaghan	Managing Director	May 1965	August 1976	11 years, 92 days
9	Sir Ronald Elliott	Managing Director	August 1976	August 1981	5 years, 0 days
10	Vern Christie	Managing Director	August 1981	March 1987	5 years, 212 days
11	Donald Sanders	Managing Director	March 1987	December 1990	3 years, 275 days
11	Donald Sanders	Chief Executive Officer	January 1991	June 1992	1 year, 181 days
12	David Murray	Chief Executive Officer	June 1992	September 2005	13 years, 92 days
13	Sir Ralph Norris	Chief Executive Officer	September 2005	November 2011	6 years, 29 days
14	Ian Narev	Chief Executive Officer	December 2011	April 2018	6 years, 128 days
15	Matt Comyn	Chief Executive Officer	April 2018	incumbent	8 years, 221 days

=== Chairs of the Board ===
Order	Name	Term start	Term end	Time in office	Notes
1	Sir John Garvan	13 October 1924	30 August 1926	1 year, 321 days	
2	Sir Robert Gibson GBE	13 September 1926	1 January 1934	7 years, 110 days	
3	Sir Claude Reading KCMG	4 January 1934	21 August 1945	11 years, 229 days	
Board abolished, 1945–1960
4	Sir Warren McDonald KBE	1 January 1960	12 November 1965	5 years, 315 days	
–	Geoffrey Rushworth (acting)	12 November 1965	27 October 1966	349 days	
5	Sir Roland Wilson	28 October 1966	13 February 1975	8 years, 108 days	
6	Finlay Crisp	14 February 1975	21 December 1984	9 years, 311 days	
7	Sir Brian Massy-Greene	21 December 1984	7 March 1988	3 years, 77 days	
8	Tim Besley AC	8 March 1988	31 October 1999	11 years, 237 days	
9	John Ralph AO	1 November 1999	5 November 2004	5 years, 4 days	
10	John Schubert AO	5 November 2004	1 February 2010	5 years, 88 days	
11	David Turner	1 February 2010	31 December 2016	6 years, 334 days	
12	Catherine Livingstone AO	1 January 2017	9 August 2022	5 years, 220 days	
13	Paul O'Malley	10 August 2022	Incumbent	4 years, 98 days	

== International operations ==
The Commonwealth Bank's international presence includes:

- Retail banks in New Zealand (ASB Bank), Turkey (CommBiz) and Indonesia (99% of PT Bank Commonwealth)
- Banking investments in China (20 per cent in both Qilu Bank and Bank of Hangzhou) and Vietnam (20 per cent stake in Vietnam International Bank)
- County banks in Hebei and Henen Provinces of China (15 branches and 8 sub-branches)
- Commonwealth Bank branches in London, New York City, Tokyo, Hong Kong, Shanghai, Beijing, Singapore, Auckland, Turkey and Mumbai
- Joint venture life insurance businesses in Indonesia (PT Commonwealth Life) and China (37.5% stake in BoCommLife)
- First State funds management business in the United Kingdom, Germany, France, Hong Kong, Singapore, Indonesia, Japan, United States and Dubai
- Representative office in Hanoi
- A Global Capability Center in Bangalore, India

== Products and services ==
The Commonwealth Bank is Australia's largest retail bank and offers customers a range of products and services, including loans, credit cards, transaction and savings accounts. It has the largest branch and ATM network. It also offers services to people planning to move to Australia.

=== NetBank ===
The Commonwealth Bank offers online banking services through NetBank. NetBank allows customers to transfer funds, manage accounts, access assets and liabilities and also manage savings and saving goals. NetBank is also offered with a mobile app available for iOS and Android.

=== Beem It ===
Beem It is an instant payment free-to-download mobile application owned by Commonwealth Bank, NAB and Westpac later sold to Eftpos Australia. It offers an instant payment transfer service between registered users of the app regardless of which bank they are with. The app's main features include options to pay, transfer, request and split money.

== Subsidiaries ==
=== Australia ===
- Bankwest
- Colonial First State
- CommInsure
- Commonwealth Securities

=== Asia Pacific ===
- PT Bank Commonwealth (Indonesia)

=== New Zealand ===
- ASB

=== Turkey ===
- TR Commbiz (Turkey)

== Sponsorship ==
Commonwealth Bank began sponsoring Cricket Australia in 1987, and the women's game since the 1990s. The partnership is due to end in June 2025.

In April 2021, Commonwealth Bank secured a four-year partnership deal with Football Australia for the naming rights of the women's national football teams as the Commonwealth Bank Matildas, Commonwealth Bank Young Matildas, and Commonwealth Bank Junior Matildas. In June 2025, it was announced that the partnership would be extending a further six years, and also extending to the men's national teams at all levels, including the Socceroos from 1 September 2025.

In November 2022, FIFA announced that Commonwealth Bank has signed on as an official supporter for the 2023 FIFA Women's World Cup.

Commonwealth Bank is also the current naming rights sponsor of Western Sydney Stadium since 2021, having taken over from its subsidiary Bankwest who were the previous rights holders since its opening 2019.

== Profits by year ==
Year	Profit
2010	▲$6.1 billion
2011	▲$6.8 billion
2012	▲$7.1 billion
2013	▲$7.8 billion
2014	▲$8.7 billion
2015	▲$9.1 billion
2016	▲$9.4 billion
2017	▲$9.8 billion
2018	▼$9.2 billion
2019	▼$8.4 billion
2020	▼$7.3 billion
2021	▲$8.65 billion
2022	▲$9.6 billion
2023	▲$10.16 billion

== See also ==
- Australian Cricket Academy
- Banking in Australia
- Commonwealth Bank Series
- Commonwealth Bank Trophy
- List of banks in Australia
- List of banks in Oceania
- Reserve Bank of Australia
- State Bank of New South Wales
- State Bank of Victoria
