= Bank of American Samoa =

Former bank in American Samoa

The Bank of American Samoa was founded in 1914 but since 2018 no longer exists.

== History ==
In 1914 Governor C. D. Stearns established the bank in American Samoa, with its headquarters at Pago Pago. On 25 July 1929, under the direction of Governor Stephen Victor Graham, the bank received a more solid legal foundation.

In 1969 Bank of Hawaii (BOH) acquired the bank, which at the time had three branches. BOH amalgamated Bank of American Samoa and operated two branches in Pago Pago, Tutuila.

In 2018, BOH donated its branches to the newly formed public bank, the Territorial Bank of American Samoa.
