= David Murray (Australian businessman) =

Australian businessman

David Murray AO
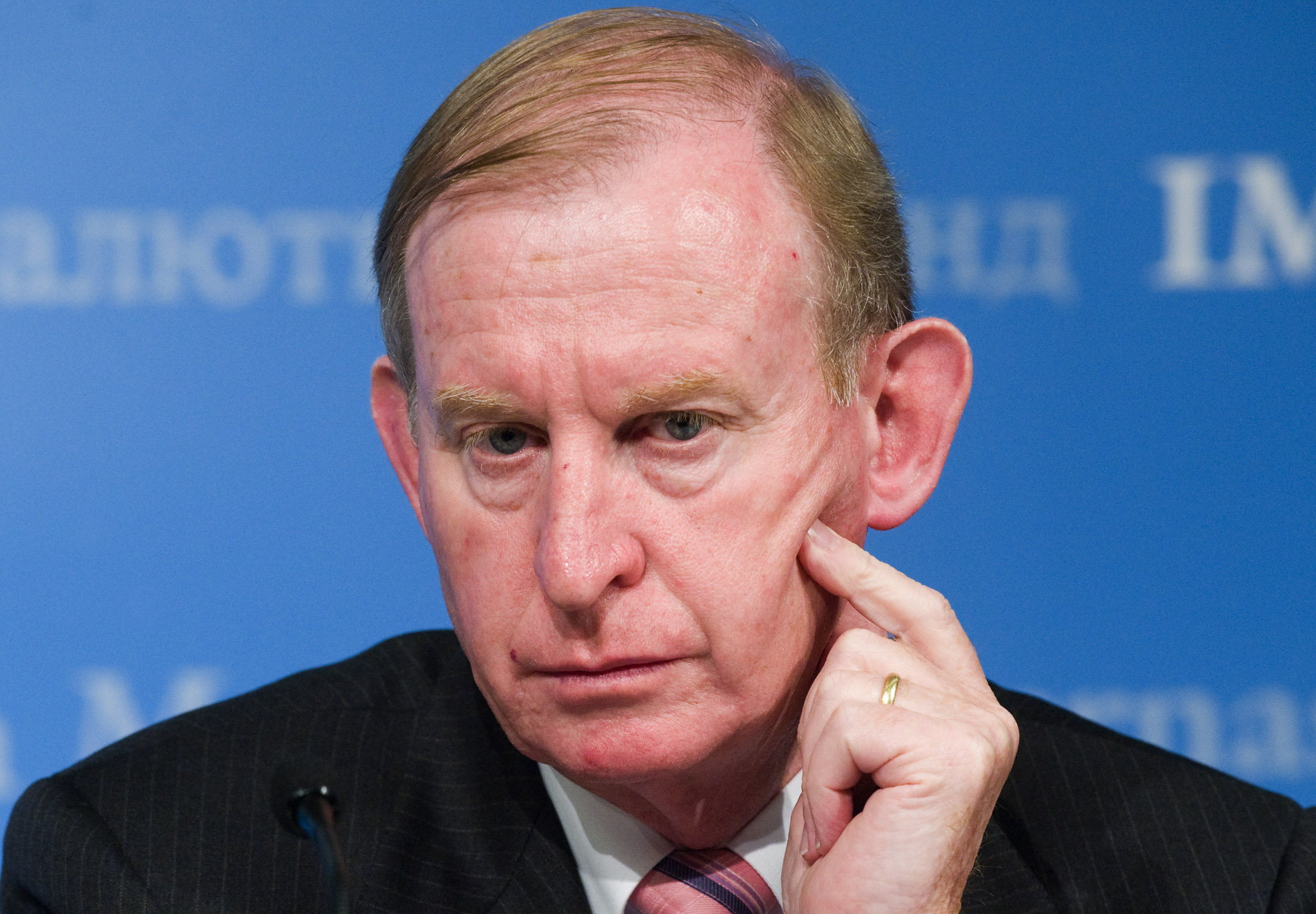
- Murray in 2008
- Born: 27 April 1949 (age 77)
- Education: St Aloysius' College, Sydney

David Victor Murray AO (born 27 April 1949), is an Australian businessman. He was the inaugural chairman of the Future Fund Board of Guardians, serving between 2006 and 2012, and chair of the International Forum of Sovereign Wealth Funds.

== Business career ==
Prior to his appointment to the Future Fund, Murray was the chief executive officer of the Commonwealth Bank between 1992 and 2005. In Murray's 13 years as chief executive, the Commonwealth Bank transformed from a partly privatised bank with a market capitalisation of $6 billion in 1992 to a $49 billion integrated financial services company, generating in the process total shareholder returns (including gross dividend reinvestment) at a compound annual growth rate of over 24 per cent, one of the highest total returns of any major bank in Australia.

Murray holds a Bachelor of Business from the NSW Institute of Technology and a Master of Business Administration, commenced at Macquarie University and completed at the International Management Institute, Geneva. He holds an honorary PhD from Macquarie University and is a Fellow of the University of Technology, Sydney. He is an old boy of St Aloysius' College, Sydney.

In 2007 Murray was appointed an Officer of the Order of Australia for service to the finance sector nationally and internationally through strategic leadership and policy development, to education, particularly fostering relations between educational institutions and business and industry, and to the community as a supporter of and fundraiser for cultural and church organisations.

== Controversies ==
Murray has made public comments on attempts to mitigate climate change. Against a backdrop of increasingly severe 2013 bush fires, he criticized a group of Australian of scientists who he said lacked any "integrity" after they attributed the disasters to increased carbon emissions. This prompted the Australian Meteorological and Oceanographic Society to publicly declare they were "disturbed" by his statements.

Murray led a push against the Australian Securities Exchange in 2019 for companies to have a social licence included in their Corporate Governance Guidelines, labelling the proposal "politically correct nonsense".

In 2018, Murray was appointed chairman of AMP Limited, resigning in August 2020 as a consequence of calls for his resignation from shareholders and political pressure due to the board's handling of staff allegations of harassment.

== Charitable Activity ==
As of 2019, Murray is chair of The Butterfly Foundation a registered charity helping people with eating disorders.

Business positions
Preceded by Donald Sanders	Chief Executive Officer of the Commonwealth Bank; 1992 – 2005	Succeeded by Ralph Norris
Preceded by inaugural	Chairman of the Board of Guardians of the Australian Government Future Fund; 2006 – 2012	Succeeded by David Gonski
