= Stephen Victor Graham =

Naval officer and Governor of American Samoa (1874–1955)

Governor of American Samoa
- In office September 9, 1927 – August 2, 1929
- Preceded by: Henry Francis Bryan
- Succeeded by: Gatewood Sanders Lincoln

Personal details
- Born: March 4, 1874 Cass County, Michigan
- Died: September 2, 1955 (aged 81)
- Spouse: Viola D Graham
- Education: United States Naval Academy
- Occupation: Naval officer

Military service
- Allegiance: United States
- Branch/service: United States Navy
- Rank: Rear admiral
- Commands: USS Cincinnati; USS Finland

Stephen Victor Graham (March 4, 1874 – September 2, 1955) was a United States Naval Rear Admiral and the governor of American Samoa from September 9, 1927, to August 2, 1929. Graham attended the United States Naval Academy and served on numerous ships before being posted to the governorship. As governor, he established a strong charter for the former Bank of American Samoa and reworked Samoan fiscal law. After his governorship, he worked at the Naval Academy as the head of the Modern Languages department.

== Life ==
=== Early life ===
Graham was born on March 4, 1874, in Cass County, Michigan.

=== Naval career ===
Graham was appointed to the United States Naval Academy from Michigan on May 19, 1890. He graduated July 1, 1896, and received the rank of lieutenant (junior grade) on July 1, 1899. He served on USS Cincinnati, USS Adams, USS Saratoga, and USS Rainbow. Later in his career, as a lieutenant commander, Graham headed the Department of Modern Languages at the United States Naval Academy. After retiring, Graham was awarded the rank of rear admiral on March 3, 1931.

== Governorship ==
On September 9, 1927, Graham became Governor of American Samoa. While in office, Graham rechartered the Bank of American Samoa and amended current fiscal laws for the island. He ceded the post to Gatewood Sanders Lincoln on August 2, 1929. Shortly after Captain Graham became governor, he received a letter from the Mau saying they would not pay any more taxes until a decision had been made regarding the “desire of the Samoa League for civil government.” Graham was invited to the Mau headquarters in Nuʻuuli, where he told them not paying taxes would be an act of defiance. The Mau said they were not hostile to the Navy administration, but believed the time had come for a change. After governor Graham explained the “Samoa for Samoans” policy of the Navy, Mau members were so impressed and discontinued their taxation efforts.

Governor Graham recommended to the U.S. Navy's secretary that they adopt a patient and attentive approach to prevent conflict when engaging with the Mau movement. A Samoan orator expressed that the community appreciated the Governor's willingness to meet and genuinely listen to them, contrasting with previous administrations that had treated them with disdain.

== Bibliography ==
- Graham, Stephen Victor (1911). Nautical Phraseology in English, French, Spanish and German: For Use at the U. S. Naval Academy. Annapolis, Maryland: United States Naval Academy.
