= Bank of Hawaii =

American commercial bank

Bank of Hawaii Corporation
- Trade name: Bank of Hawaii
- Formerly: Hawaii Bancorporation (1971–1979); Bancorp Hawaii (1979–1997); Pacific Century Financial Corporation (1997–2002)
- Type: Public
- Traded as: NYSE: BOH; S&P 600 component
- Industry: Finance
- Founded: December 17, 1897; 128 years ago in Honolulu, Hawaii
- Founder: Charles Montague Cooke; Peter Cushman Jones; Joseph Ballard Atherton
- Headquarters: Honolulu, Hawaii, U.S.
- Key people: Peter S. Ho; (President, Chairman, & CEO); Kent T. Lucien; (Director & CFO)
- Products: Banking
- Revenue: ▲US$ 655.243 million (2016)
- Operating income: ▲US$ 299.92 million (2016)
- Net income: ▲US$ 181.46 million (2016)
- Total assets: ▲US$ 16.49 billion (2016)
- Total equity: ▲US$ 1.16 billion (2016)
- Number of employees: 2,122 (2016)
- Website: boh.com

The Bank of Hawaii Corporation (Hawaiian: Panakō o Hawaiʻi; abbreviated BOH) is an American regional commercial bank headquartered in Honolulu, Hawaii. It is Hawaii's second oldest bank and its largest locally owned bank in that the majority of the voting stockholders reside within the state. Bank of Hawaii has the most accounts, customers, branches, and ATMs of any financial institution in the state (although First Hawaiian Bank holds a greater number of dollars in deposits). The bank consists of four business segments: retail banking, commercial banking, investment services, and treasury. The bank is currently headed by chairman, president and chief executive officer, Peter S. Ho.

== Beginnings ==
In 1893, Charles Montague Cooke (1849–1909) with his brother-in-law Joseph Ballard Atherton and business partner Peter Cushman Jones founded Bank of Hawaii. In 1897, it was chartered in the Republic of Hawaii by Interior Minister James A. King. A decade after its founding, in 1903, the bank opened its first branch in Kauai. In 1922, the bank acquired First Bank of Hilo, which had four branches. In 1930, it amalgamated Bank of Maui.

== Bank of Maui ==
Charles Dexter Lufkin organized First National Bank of Wailuku in 1901. Five years later, he had organized Lahaina National Bank. Then he organized the First National Bank of Paia in 1913. Lastly, in 1917, First National Bank of Paia merged with Lahaina National Bank and First National Bank of Wailuku to form Bank of Maui.

== Activities in Hawaii since 1971 ==
In 1971, BOH formed a bank holding company called Hawaii Bancorporation.

In 1979, Hawaii Bancorporation changed its name to Bancorp Hawaii. In 1985, BOH as Bancorp Hawaii acquired the Hawaiian Trust Company for $19 million.

In 1990, BOH as Bancorp Hawaii acquired FirstFed America Inc. with its First Federal Savings and Loan Association in Hawaii and First Savings of Guam subsidiaries for $141 million in cash. First Federal Savings was maintained as a separate entity until 1998 when it was merged into the Bank of Hawaii.

Bancorp Hawaii changed its name to Pacific Century Financial Corporation (PCFC) in 1997.

Large drop in the firm's stock in early 2000 caused by bad loans and quick expansion outside of the firm's core business of Hawaii, Guam, and American Samoa led to a change in management.

BOH as Pacific Century Financial Corporation sold off its credit card division to American Express for an undisclosed amount in 2001.

In 2002, Pacific Century Financial Corporation was renamed Bank of Hawaii Corporation.

== Activities on the U.S. Mainland ==
In its first expansion onto the continental United States, BOH as Bancorp Hawaii acquired the Phoenix, Arizona-based First National Bancorp of Arizona with its five-office First National Bank of Arizona subsidiary for an undisclosed amount in 1987. Ten years later, through its First National Bank of Arizona subsidiary, BOH acquired all four Arizona branch offices from Home Savings of America for an undisclosed amount in 1997 and merged those offices into First National while at nearly the same time changed the name of First National to Pacific Century Bank NA.

The following year, BOH as Pacific Century Financial Corporation acquired the Encino, California-based CU Bancorp with its California United Bank subsidiary for $183 million in stock and cash. Just shortly after the acquisition was finalized in 1998, California United and its 22 offices in Southern California was merged into Phoenix-based Pacific Century Bank and the headquarters for the newly combined Pacific Century Bank was moved to Encino.

After 14 years on the Mainland, BOH decided to abandon their activities on the Mainland in 2001 by selling all 9 Arizona branch offices of the Pacific Century Bank to Zions Bancorporation for an undisclosed amount and all 20 California branch offices of the Pacific Century Bank to U.S. Bancorp for an undisclosed amount. Zion merged their purchase into their National Bank of Arizona subsidiary.

== International activities ==
It was not until 1959 that BOH made another novel move when it opened its first Pacific Islands branch on Kwajalein. Two years later, it opened a branch in both Palau and Guam. Ten years later, BOH continued its international expansion by absorbing Bank of American Samoa, which the Navy had established in 1914. That same year, it created Banque de Tahiti as a joint venture between itself and Crédit Lyonnais. The next year, BOH established a branch in Yap. Branches in Ponape and Kosrae followed in the subsequent years.

It also continued its expansion outside Hawaii with the establishment of a branch in Saipan. Three years later, BOH and Crédit Lyonnais established another joint-venture, Banque de Nouvelle Calédonie in Nouméa.

In 1980, BOH opened a branch in Tokyo.

BOH acquired Wells Fargo Bank's Seoul, Korea, and Singapore operations in 1991. Two years later, it acquired Banque Indosuez's operations in Vanuatu, which became Banque d’Hawaii (Vanuatu). That same year, BOH also opened its first branch in Suva, Fiji in 1993. Branches in Nadi and Lautoka followed. In 1994, BOH acquired Commonwealth Bank of Australia's 51% ownership in the National Bank of Solomon Islands. BOH also acquired Crédit Lyonnais' holdings in Banque de Nouvelle Calédonie, giving BOH 91 percent ownership.

Banque de Nouvelle Calédonie changed its name to Bank of Hawaii—Nouvelle Calédonie. BOH also purchased Banque Indosuez Nuigini in Papua New Guinea from Banque Indosuez for $5.6 million and renamed it Bank of Hawaii (PNG) Ltd. In addition to its main office in Port Moresby, Bank of Hawaii (PNG) also had an office in Lae, PNG's second port city on the Northeast Coast. Indosuez Nuigini was established in 1983 with 49 percent Indosuez participation, 41.5 percent Bank of Papua New Guinea, and the remainder public.

=== International acquisitions ===
In 1998, BOH bought 5.4mn convertible notes of Bank of Queensland for $22 million as part of a strategic alliance giving rise to a true reflecting of the convertible note value into 49% ownership at that time. It also acquired 100 percent of Banque Paribas Pacifique (est. 1972; 3 branches) and 70 percent of Banque Paribas Polynésie (est. 1984; 1 branch). BOH integrated the operations with Bank of Hawaii-Nouvelle Calédonie and Banque de Tahiti, respectively. In 1999, BOH bought 5.8mn shares (approx. 10 percent) in Bank of Queensland.

=== Withdraw from international financial services markets ===
In 2001, BOH sold its 6.2mn shares and 5.4mn convertible notes in Bank of Queensland for $20 million and $16 million respectively. The decision reflected PCFC's new strategic plan, which mandated a focus on the bank's core markets in Hawaii, American Samoa, and Guam. BOH sold its shareholding in the Bank of Tonga and Pacific Commercial Bank of Samoa to Westpac. BOH and Westpac both had 30 percent interests in Bank of Tonga and 42 percent interests in Pacific Commercial Bank. BOH sold its operations in Papua New Guinea, Vanuatu, and Fiji to ANZ for AU$100 million. BOH sold its approximately 95 percent share interest in its French Polynesia and New Caledonia operations to France-based Caisse Nationale des Caisses d'Epargne (CNCE). Its operations in French Polynesia included 17 branches of its subsidiary, Banque de Tahiti, and about 265 employees. Its operations in New Caledonia included eight branches of subsidiary Bank of Hawaii-Nouvelle Caledonie and about 190 employees. Lastly, BOH closed its offices in Hong Kong, Seoul, Singapore, and Taipei.

In 2002, BOH was unable to find a buyer for its bank properties in the Central Pacific when it was trying to withdraw from those markets. As a result, BOH closed its Majuro branch in the Republic of the Marshall Islands (RMI) and its three branches in Pohnpei, Yap, and Kosrae in the Federated States of Micronesia (FSM). BOH turned over its 51 percent interest in National Bank of Solomon Islands to the government of the Solomon Islands.

== Governance ==
Poor performance by the bank in early 2000, contributed to chairman and CEO Lawrence M. Johnson's resignation in 2000 and bank president Richard Dahl being passed over as Johnson's replacement. Dahl left the company in 2002.

In November 2000, Michael E. O'Neill was hired from outside the company to serve as chairman and CEO to correct mistakes made by the previous management. O'Neill did not take a salary or any bonuses during his three years at the helm, but in 2004 he controlled about 2.73 million — about 5 percent — of the bank's total shares directly or under option. O'Neill reversed the company's decline by selling off properties outside the company's core business area of Hawaii, Guam, and American Samoa. O'Neill stepped down as chairman and CEO in 2004.

In December 2003, Allan R. Landon was promoted from chief financial officer to president and later to chairman and CEO upon O'Neill leaving in September 2004. Under Landon's leadership, the Bank of Hawaii survived the 2008 financial crisis without federal assistance.

In 2008, Landon handed his position of president to Peter S. Ho while Landon retained his chairman and CEO posts. Two years later Ho was given the additional titles of chairman and chief executive officer in addition to president upon the retirement of Allan R. Landon in 2010.

== See also ==
- List of S&P 400 companies
