= Rob Chapman (businessman) =

Australian businessman (born 1964)

Robert (Rob) Ian Chapman AM (born 1964) is an Australian businessman, former CEO of St George Bank and former chairman of the Adelaide Football Club and currently chair of the board of Adelaide Airport. He has previously been considered to be one of South Australia's most influential people.

== Early years ==
Chapman was born in 1964 at Mount Barker and educated at Sacred Heart College.

Chapman's early career was spent in the insurance and funds management industry, initially in Adelaide, then in Brisbane, Sydney and Melbourne before returning to Adelaide and taking executive roles in banking. He has held senior appointments at:

- Prudential Corporation Australia
- Colonial State Bank
- Regional General Manager for the Commonwealth Bank's operations in South Australia, Northern Territory and Western Australia (-2002)
- Managing Director of BankSA (2002-2010)
- Chief Executive Officer of St George Bank (2010-2012)

Chapman was appointed a Member of the Order of Australia in the 2025 Australia Day Honours.

== Professional ==
- (former) President of BusinessSA.
- (former) President, SA chapter, the Committee for Economic Development of Australia.
- Member of the South Australian Economic Development Board.
- Chair, University of South Australia MBA program
- (former) Member of the Premier's Climate Change Council
- Chairman of Adelaide Airport
- Non-Executive Chairman of Perks
- Member of the South Australian Government's Economic Development Cabinet Committee
- Global Chairman of Investment Attraction SA
- Chairman of Barossa Valley Infrastructure
- Chairman of the Adelaide Football Club
- Director of Coopers Brewery.

== Adelaide Football Club ==
Chapman was first appointed chairman of the board of directors of the Adelaide Crows Football Club in December 2008 for 2009. He was reappointed chairman for 2010 and 2011. He stepped down as chairman in October 2020.

== Personal ==
Chapman is married to Lisa. They have four children.
