= Countrywide Bank (New Zealand) =

Defunct bank in New Zealand

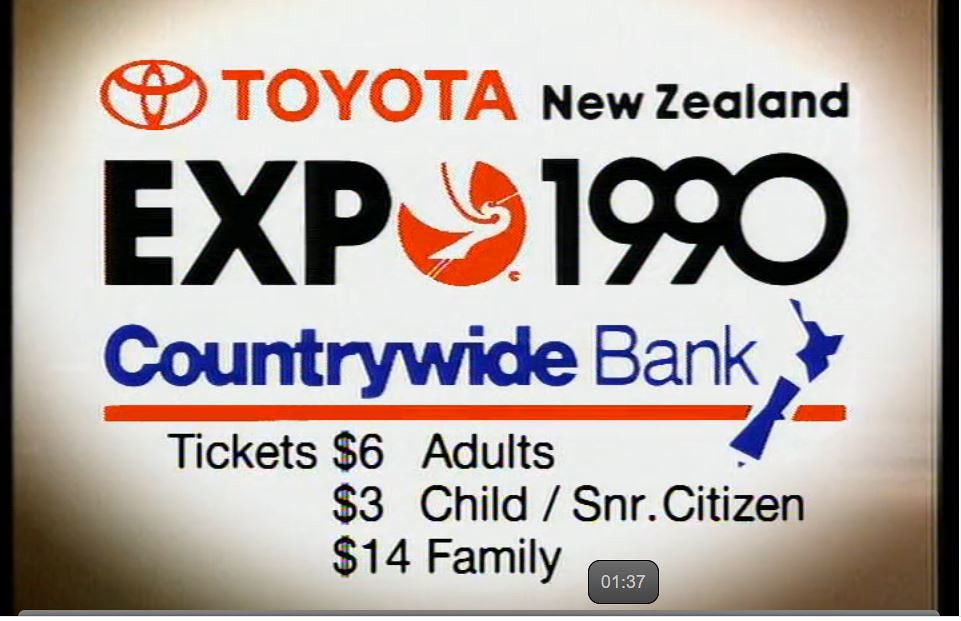
Still from video promoting Expo 1990 sponsored by Countrywide Bank

Countrywide Banking Corporation limited was a retail bank operating throughout New Zealand until 1998 when it was acquired by the National Bank of New Zealand. It was created from Countrywide Building Society, which itself emerged from the original Auckland Co-operative Terminating Building Society created in March 1897.

== History ==
Countrywide Bank registered as a bank in 1987 during a period of significant regulatory change in the New Zealand banking system. At the time of registration the bank's two major shareholders were Bank of Scotland, a large Scottish bank headquartered in Edinburgh, and General Accident, a major general insurer headquartered in Perth, Scotland. The bank was listed on the New Zealand Stock Exchange.

In 1992 Countrywide Bank purchased the United Building Society from the State Bank of South Australia. At the time Countrywide was larger and has subsequently been described as much more efficient than United.

In 1998 The National Bank of New Zealand, which itself was owned by Lloyds Bank in the UK, purchased Countrywide Bank from the Bank of Scotland, which by this time had become the sole owner of the bank. The operations of the two banks were merged with a period of consolidation in the retail network that allowed National Bank customers to use Countrywide Bank branches even though the two banks were yet to merge their back-end computer networks. The combined branch network was then rationalised with the rebranding of all branches to the National Bank branding and the closure of surplus and duplicated branches.

Building societies merged or purchased by Countrywide Building Society/Countrywide Bank:

- Auckland Co-operative Terminating Building Society
- Central Union Permanent a.k.a. New Plymouth Investment and Loan Society
- Central Building Society, Palmerston North Co-op Building Society
- Consolidated Permanent Building Society
- Countrywide Permanent Building Society
- New Plymouth Investment and Loan Building Society
- Provident Investment and Building Society of Taranaki Building Society a.k.a. Countrywide Permanent Building Society
- Western Building Society Building Society a.k.a. Western Co-op, Western Co-op Terminating Building Society
- Western Co-operative Building Society
- Western Consolidated Permanent Building Society a.k.a. Consolidated Permanent Building Society and Feilding Permanent & Investment Society
