= United Building Society =

United Building Society was a New Zealand building society, that became registered retail bank known as United Banking Group. It was acquired by the State Bank of South Australia in 1990, which sold the bank to the Countrywide Bank in 1992 after the State Bank of S.A. had made significant losses. The United Bank was merged with other Countrywide operations, and the name was dropped in 1994.

== History ==
United Building Society was formed from merging or purchasing the operations of a number of smaller building societies including:

- Canterbury Premier Building Society
- Canterbury Terminating Building Society and Bank of Deposit Building Society
- Bay of Plenty Co-operative Terminating Building Society
- Bay of Plenty Permanent Building Society
- Canterbury Building Building Society
- Eastern Co-operative Terminating Building Society
- General Co-operative Terminating Building Society
- Hawkes Bay Mutual Permanent Building Society also known as Hawkes Bay Permanent Building Society
- Lyttleton Premier Permanent Building Society
- Marac
- Metropolitan Permanent Building and Investment Society
- New Zealand Co-operative Terminating Building Society
- Northern Co-operative Building Building Society
- Northern Co-operative Terminating Building Society
- Northern United Building Society
- Northern United Permanent Building Society
- Permanent Building Society of Invercargill
- Premier Building Loan and Investment Society of Lyttleton
- The Equitable Permanent Building Society
- United Building Society of Hawkes Bay
- Waipukurau Permanent Investment Building Society
- Wellington Permanent Building Society

By 1990 the United Building Society also operated a chain of real estate agents, United Realty, which is now part of the Ray White Group.

On 29 June 1990 United Building Society of New Zealand transformed itself into a limited liability company and was renamed United Banking Group Limited. The new company was registered as a bank with the Reserve Bank of New Zealand and was purchased by the State Bank of South Australia in 1990, for NZ$150 million. The Auditor-General of South Australia stated that the price represented the total amount of capital in United Banking Group. At the time the Building Society was engaged in mortgage and commercial lending, real estate broking (United Realty), retirement village development (United Lifecare) and insurance, as well as sharebroking (United Sharebrokers), and was reportedly trading unprofitably.

On 13 December 1990 United Banking Group Limited changed its name to United Bank Ltd and updated its registration with the Reserve Bank.

The State Bank of Australia had expected to take advantage of a transaction that was to involve no net investment (the purchase price was to be immediately returned after purchase through a capital return), and the deregulation of the New Zealand banking industry, which would allow United to launch a full range of retail banking products including checking accounts. The expected performance of the new bank did not eventuate, with delays in launching new products, lower than expected profits, and significant losses accrued from United's subsidiary activities.

In 1992 the bank was sold to the Countrywide Building Society. At the time of the sale it was considered a non-performing asset, having reported a loss of $123.3M in 1991.

The bank's registration was relinquished on 16 May 1994.
