= Savings Bank of South Australia =

Bank in South Australia

- Industry: Banking
- Founded: 11 March 1848
- Defunct: 1984
- Fate: Merged with the State Bank of South Australia to form the Bank of South Australia
- Headquarters: Adelaide, South Australia, Australia

The Savings Bank of South Australia was a bank founded in the colony of South Australia in 1848, based in Adelaide. In the early 20th century it established a presence in schools by setting up a special category of savings accounts for schoolchildren, and grew through the following decades.

In 1984 it merged with the State Bank of South Australia, with the merged entity taking the latter name. This entity later became known as BankSA, and as of 2022 is a division and a trading name of St George Bank, which is a subsidiary of Westpac.

== Foundation and early days ==
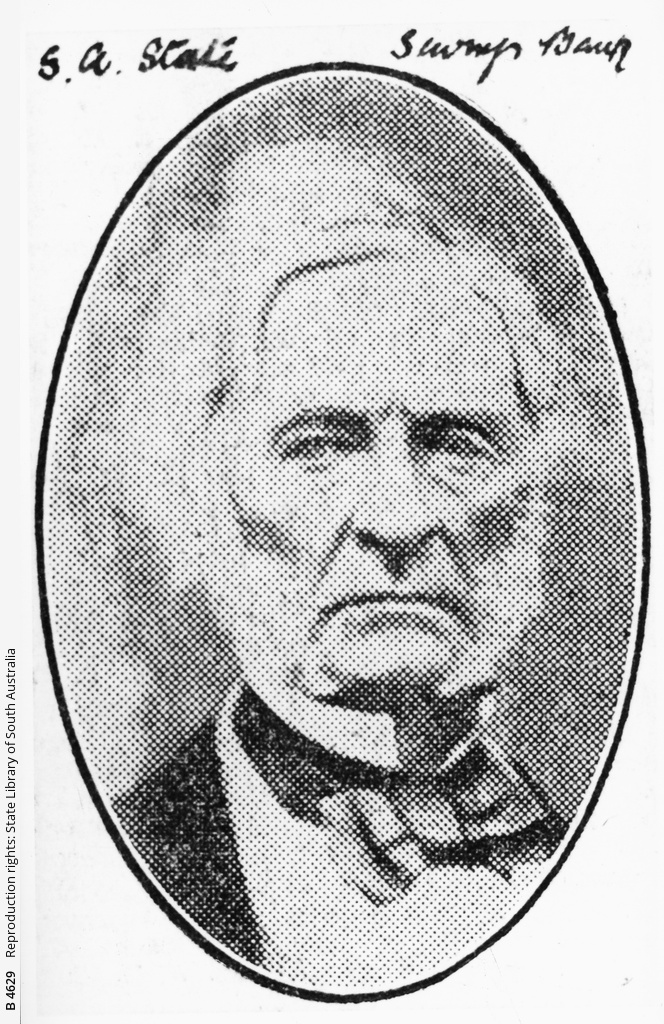
John Hector, c.1855

The Savings Bank of South Australia was established in the colony of South Australia on 11 March 1848, as a savings bank. Its sole employee was John Hector, who started the business a single room in Gawler Place, Adelaide, that was provided rent-free by the Glen Osmond Mining Company.

The first deposit comprised the life savings (£29) of an Afghan shepherd, a Mr Singh, made by his employer. A month later, the fledgling bank made its first loan, of £500, to John Colton, later a successful businessman and later politician, who in 1875 was appointed to the bank's board of trustees

The first premier of the colony, B. T. Finniss, was a trustee of the bank's inaugural board, and F. H. Robe, Lieutenant Governor of the colony, was president of the bank.

The Savings Bank of South Australia later merged with the former State Bank of South Australia (established 1896), becoming the new State Bank, owned by the Government of South Australia, in 1984.

== 1907: Penny Bank Department ==
In 1907 the Savings Bank of South Australia established the Penny Bank Department to take deposits as little as one penny from school children. These school savings account quickly became popular and almost every public and private school in the state was permitted to take deposits from children on behalf of the bank. School banking was instrumental in instilling the savings mentality in children and helped to make the bank the largest in South Australia, now a state.

== 1938–1965: growth and development ==
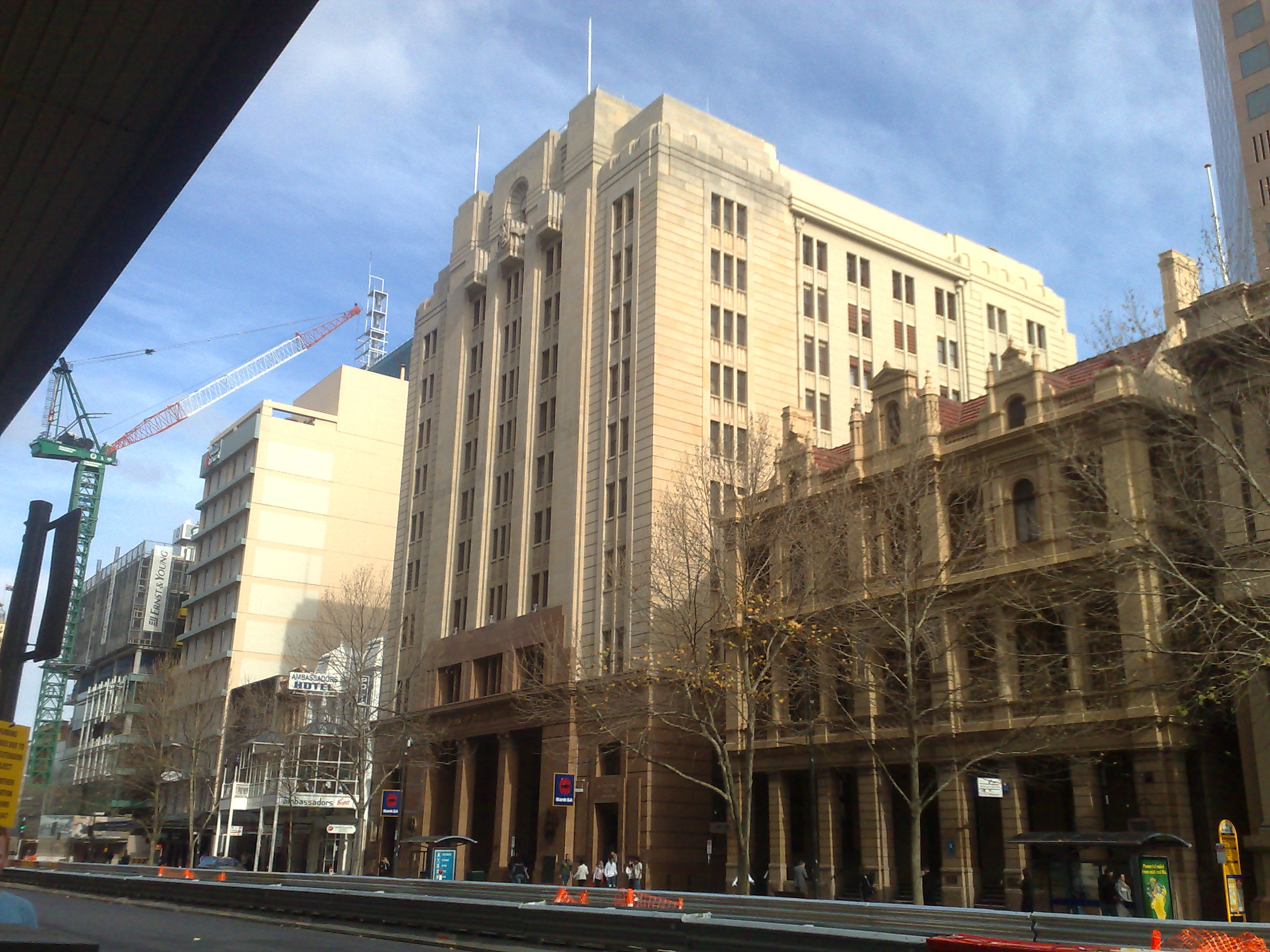
Former Savings Bank of SA and now BankSA head office on King William Street, Adelaide, completed in 1943

During the 26-year era of Liberal premier Thomas Playford (November 1938 – March 1965), the bank was a key tool of his vision for the state's rapid economic and industrial development. Playford used both the Savings Bank and the State Bank to finance the Electricity Trust of South Australia and the South Australian Housing Trust.

The two state-owned banks complemented each other. The savings bank was for the people to deposit their savings and for others to borrow money for mortgages on fair terms, while the state bank was used for larger projects. During this period the bank took on many new customers, especially migrants brought out to South Australia under assisted migration schemes.

=== Head office building ===
The architects Eric McMichael and Alfred Charles Harris, in their practice E.H. McMichael and Harris, designed the new Savings Bank building at 97 King William Street in 1938. However, owing to shortages of both labour and materials during World War II, it took five years to be completed. It was their largest-ever commission, and at the time became the city's tallest building. McMichael was responsible for the design, after trustees and executives of the bank had visited Sydney and Melbourne to inspect the most modern buildings in those cities. The style is mainly Art Deco, with some Classical elements. Significant to the Art Deco style are the motifs depicting South Australian agriculture, along with the use of parallel lines, the polished granite base and the monumental entrance. The building was listed on the South Australian Heritage Register on 11 September 1986.

== 1970s–1984: lead-up to the merger ==
Labor premier Don Dunstan (June 1970 – February 1979) first floated the idea of merging the State Bank and the Savings Bank, but the conservative trustees of the bank were strongly opposed to this idea and highly suspicious of the Labor Party. Early in his premiership, Dunstan had got the trustees offside by deceiving them by stating he intended to pass some minor annual leave changes through the Parliament, while actually changing the formation of the board and allowing the Labor Government to appoint the chairman of the Savings Bank and allowing trustees to sit on both boards. This had effect of giving control of the banks to Labor Party and not the trustees, who had ably served both of the banks for many decades. Dunstan also had raided both of the banks of their reserve funds to pay for his health, education and arts schemes.

After Dunstan had changed the composition of the banks boards, they requested a merger. However, Labor lost the 1979 election and Liberal premier David Tonkin (September 1979 – November 1982) would not allow the banks to merge.

Under the Labor premier John Bannon (November 1982 – September 1992), the two banks were merged in 1984.

== State Bank of South Australia ==
The combined bank, called the State Bank of South Australia, had rapid growth in the economic boom of the 1980s. However at the end of the boom came a bust, and the State Bank of SA (like the State Bank of Victoria) was unable to withstand the early 1990s recession in Australia. The State Bank of SA failed because it had a "non-performing" loan portfolio, meaning that repayments were not made on money lent. It later became BankSA.
