= Enhanced Telephone =

The Enhanced Telephone is a telephone developed by Citibank's Enhanced Telephone Services subsidiary in the late 1980s for customers to do banking and other financial transactions from their home. The official launch date was February 26–27, 1990, for customers in New York only.

The first version of the Enhanced Telephone, the 99A model, was beige and featured a keyboard and monochrome miniature CRT screen. Because of its chunky appearance, several developers dubbed it the "sawed-off ski boot." The physical hardware was manufactured by Transaction Technologies Incorporated (TTI).

The second version of the Enhanced Telephone, the P100 model, was manufactured by Philips Electronics based on experiences gained from manufacturing Minitel and featured a miniature keyboard, an LCD screen, and more sleek styling. The font was developed by Bitstream Inc.

Software for the Enhanced Telephone was written in a proprietary language called HAL (Home Application Language).

Citibank believed that it was considerably easier to manage financial transactions with the enhanced telephone than with a personal computer, but the product ultimately failed to become a viable product because by the time it was introduced, home banking via PCs was becoming more common and by the 1990s the Enhanced Telephone had been rendered obsolete by the growing popularity of the World Wide Web.

The Philips P100 phone lived on and to this day variations of it are used for other applications.
