= State Bank of South Australia =

Bank owned by the Government of South Australia (1896–1991)

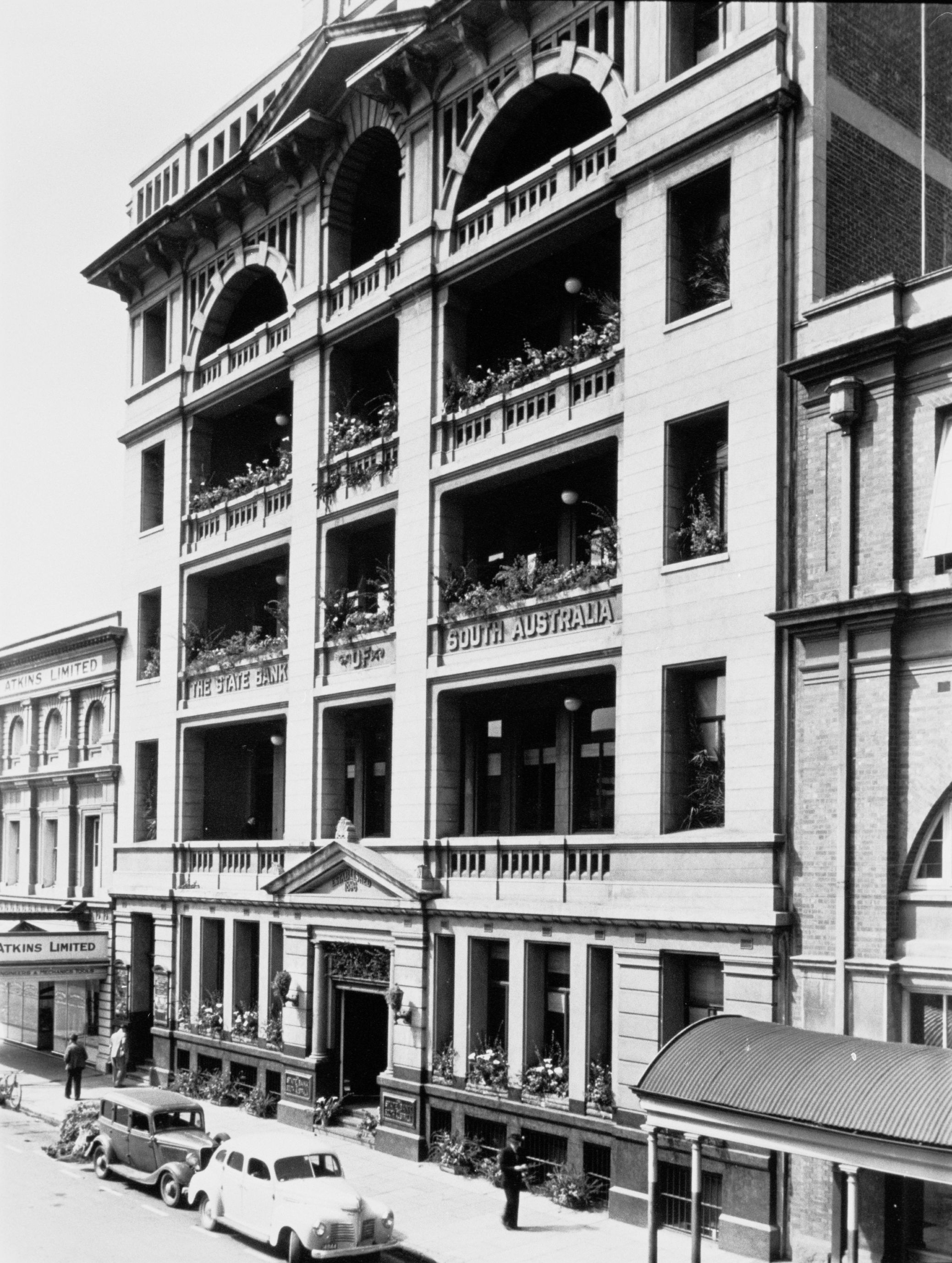
- The State Bank of South Australia headquarters in Adelaide
- Type: State-owned company
- Industry: Financial services
- Founded: 1896
- Founder: Government of South Australia
- Defunct: 1991
- Fate: Bank failure
- Successor: BankSA
- Headquarters: Adelaide, Australia
- Area served: State of South Australia
- Products: Banking services
- Owner: Australian Government

The State Bank of South Australia was a bank created in 1896 and owned by the Government of South Australia. The bank became the subject of a two-year South Australian Royal Commission upon its collapse in 1991. The surviving part of the bank now exists as BankSA.

== History ==
=== Early history ===
The State Bank of South Australia was founded in 1896 as the outcome of an act of Parliament, the Advances Bill, which provided for setting up of the bank which could benefit the State's primary producers and other industries by providing loans guaranteed by the government at preferential conditions. A bill based on a failed Victorian proposal was introduced by the Kingston-Holder government in 1894 but lapsed, then revived with clarifications by Frederick Holder (later Sir Frederick) in 1895.

The bill passed both houses of parliament in December 1895, and five trustees were appointed: H. M. Addison (chairman), J. B. Spence, J. Angas Johnson, (Note: Johnson was a grandson and protégé of George Fife Angas) S. Stanton and G. Inglis.

Addison resigned 1897 after being cited as the co-respondent in the Nixon v. Nixon divorce case and was replaced by G. Fuller; Inglis took on the role of Chairman 1900–1914; Stanton and Johnson died in 1902 within a week of each other, so the trustees were without a quorum and could not meet until replacements E. W. Krichauff and A. M. Simpson were appointed.

Their first meeting was held at the Treasury offices on 11 February 1896, and called for applicants for the post of Inspector General, resulting in a large number of candidates, from whom G. S. Wright was selected.

Though the bank was a legal entity from 5 February 1896 and able to lend money on mortgage, it had no access to funds until the Treasurer (Holder) made it an advance of an undisclosed sum, modest but adequate to get the business running. The sum was soon repaid and the bank required no further assistance. So began Australia's first state bank, and was soon emulated by Victoria, Western Australia, Queensland and New South Wales.

In the 24 years Wright was at the helm (1896–1920) the bank funded £7,250,000 of loans to around 10,000 mortgagors.

A new building was erected for the bank on Rundle Street east, and opened on 1 March 1915. It soon proved inadequate, and in 1928 a new five-storey building was opened on Pirie Street.

=== Later years ===
The bank was expanded in 1984 by its merger with the Savings Bank of South Australia, with the expanded entity retaining the "State Bank of South Australia" name.

In March 1988, the bank purchased the life insurance and managed funds business Oceanic Capital Corporation for $60 million. In the same year, its landmark building, then the tallest in Adelaide, was built in Currie Street, later Westpac House and as of 2023, RAA Place.

Questions over the financial viability of the bank were first raised prior to the 1989 state election by Opposition Liberal Party member Jennifer Cashmore.

In June 1990, the United Building Society was purchased for $NZ150.0 million.

== Collapse ==
The bank's financial implosion in 1991 was one of the biggest economic disasters in the state's history. As a government-owned bank, deposits were guaranteed (legally underwritten) by the Government of South Australia.

The bank's managing director, Tim Marcus Clark, was ultimately considered the most legally responsible for the bank's downfall, Labor Premier John Bannon resigned in 1992, and a landslide electoral defeat of the state Labor government occurred at the subsequent 1993 election, won by the Liberal opposition led by Dean Brown.

The State Bank collapse continued to affect the state's finances and politics into the 21st century. The State Bank debt was given as the main reason for the privatisation of Electricity Trust of South Australia by the second-term Liberal minority government led by John Olsen.

The saleable portion of the State Bank was acquired by Advance Bank, which was bought by St George Bank. The Bank of South Australia (also known as BankSA) is now a division of and a trading name of St George Bank. St George Bank was taken over by Westpac on 1 December 2008.

=== Causes ===
In March 1991, the Auditor General of South Australia was appointed to conduct an inquiry to determine the causes of the State Bank's need for government support. The report, delivered in 1993, found the key cause of financial distress was the non-performing assets of the bank, its loan portfolio. The non-performing assets were corporate and property-related loans made by the bank. At the time of the bailout, non-performing assets exceeded 30% of the loan book. The report found that 'to a lesser extent', its investments in major subsidiaries acquired between 1985 and 1990 also performed poorly and were a contributory cause.

The Auditor General, however, made it clear that while external factors were causes of the bank's poor financial position, 'a contributing cause of the institution's financial failure' was the failure by the bank to adequately manage the debt, capital, interest rate risk and liquidity risk of the bank. The report indicated that this was because 'policy and procedural inadequacies, and the lack of effective supervision and control of certain of the bank's activities, contribute to the mismanagement of the business of the Bank as a whole'.

In March 1991, Samuel Jacobs QC was appointed to head a South Australian Royal Commission to investigate the relationship between the bank and the South Australian government and the arrangements under the Bank of South Australia Act for the governance of the bank. The first witness to be called was John Barnes, the state's former Under-Treasurer (1976–1984). Three reports of the commission's findings were published in 1992 and 1993. The first and second reports were presented by the Honourable Samuel J. Jacobs and the final report was presented by John Mansfield.

Bannon remained as Premier during three inquiries, the last two of which cleared him of any deliberate wrongdoing.

== Takeover ==
In 1995, Advance Bank bought the "good bank" and continued to run it as a separate entity named the Bank of South Australia, and trading as BankSA. In 1997, St George Bank took over the Advance Bank and its BankSA subsidiary. In 2008, St George merged with Westpac.
