= St.George Bank =

Australian banking institution

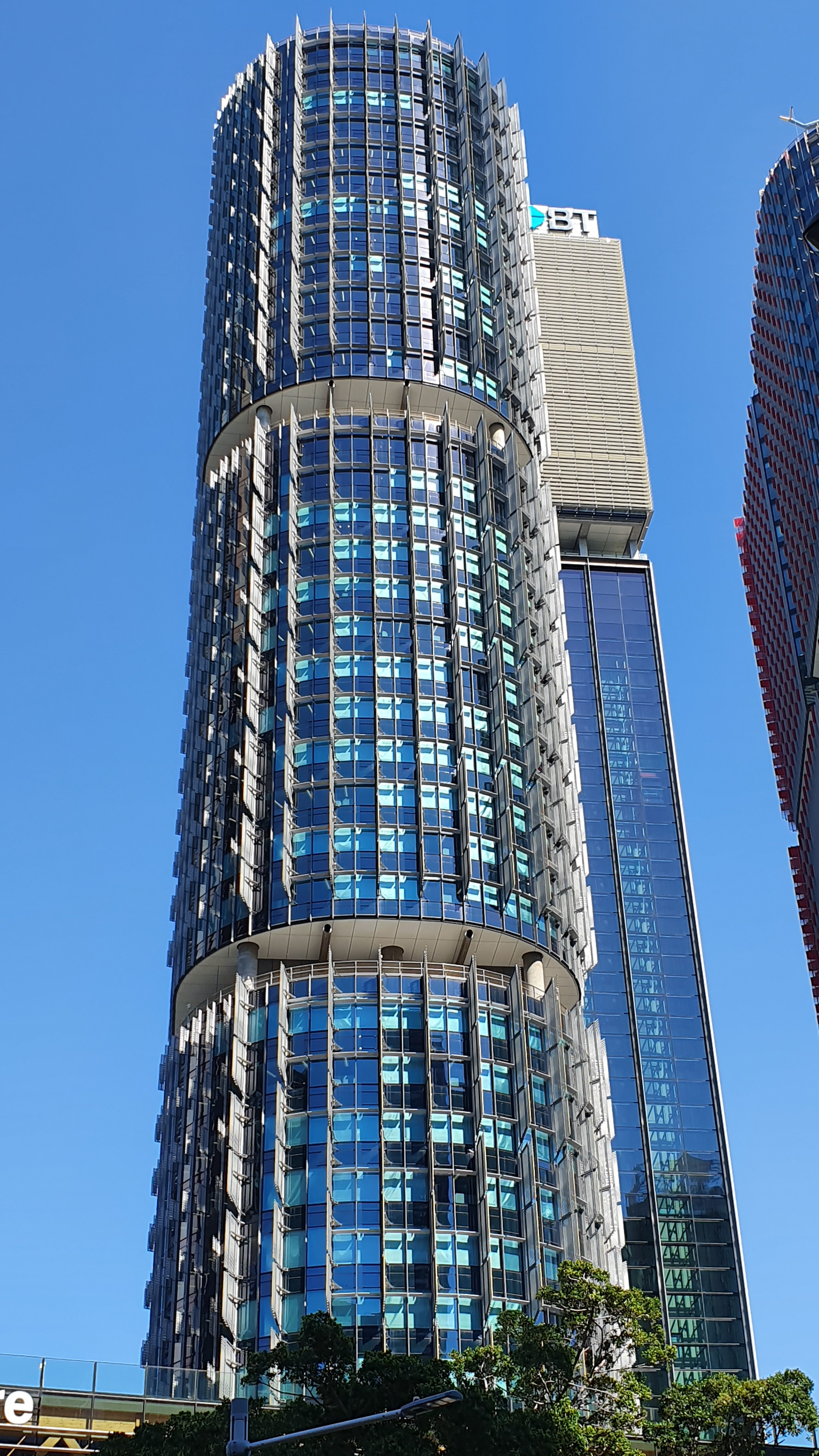
- Headquarters at Tower 2 of the International Towers complex, Barangaroo, Sydney
- Type: Subsidiary
- Industry: Financial, banking
- Founded: 1937; 89 years ago, as a building society 1992; 34 years ago, as a bank & public company
- Headquarters: International Tower 2, Barangaroo, Sydney, Australia
- Key people: Ross Miller (General Manager)
- Products: Retail, business and specialist banking
- Parent: Westpac
- Website: www.stgeorge.com.au

St.George Bank is an Australian bank with its headquarters in Sydney. Since a 2008 merger, the bank has been part of Westpac, having previously been an independent legal entity. In 2010, St.George was deregistered as a company and ceased to be a standalone authorised deposit-taking institution.

The bank provides services primarily in New South Wales and the Australian Capital Territory, but with growing representation across a number of industry and business segments in Queensland and Western Australia, and in Victoria before the relaunch of the Bank of Melbourne (2011) brand in July 2011 (also another division of Westpac). St.George also operates in South Australia and the Northern Territory under its subsidiary BankSA. The bank has a large number of retail branches and ATMs across Australia, and some back office operations in Bangalore, India.

== History ==
=== Origins ===
The current bank is the result of the merger and/or acquisition of a number of building societies and banks.

The St.George Co-operative Building Society Ltd. was formed on 6 May 1937 in the Sydney suburb of Hurstville, with George Cross as the first chairman of the board. The Cronulla & District Co-operative Building Society was formed in June 1937. The two Co-operatives merged in 1945, and with the post-war housing boom, the St.George and Cronulla Building Society expanded rapidly, with 38 branches established by 1955. In 1955, the society became a Permanent Building Society, which enabled its loans to be larger and terms shorter. In 1961 the first Sydney branch opened in Miranda, followed by the first Sydney city branch in August 1963. The expansion of the branch network continued through the 1960s. The society also operated 41 agencies.

In 1972, St.George was the first building society to 'go on-line' with the installation of an IBM mainframe computer connected to 30 terminals. Shortly after, the black light signature system for passbooks was introduced, a system which had been adopted by the banks in the late 1960s.

In 1979, radio announcer John Laws almost caused a run on St.George Building Society when he told his listeners "a big building society is going to go bust". St.George kept its doors open and paid out every withdrawal. The then Premier of New South Wales, Neville Wran, later stood outside a branch and said he could personally guarantee the society's financial security.

In the 1990s, the headquarters moved to Montgomery Street, Kogarah, and in 1992, the society gained its banking licence, demutualised, and became a public company.

The NSW Permanent Building & Investment Society was established in 1939. The society became a bank in 1985 under the name Advance Bank.

In 1848, the Savings Bank of South Australia opened for business in Gawler Place, Adelaide, and the organisation which became the State Bank of South Australia opened in rural South Australia. Both were guaranteed by the Government of South Australia. The two banks were merged in 1984 and traded as the State Bank of South Australia, retaining the Government guarantee. After excessive insufficiently secured lending through the 1980s, the bank collapsed, and because of the guarantee, was bailed out by the State Government. In 1992 the bank was split into the "bad bank" with the non-performing debts, and the "good bank".

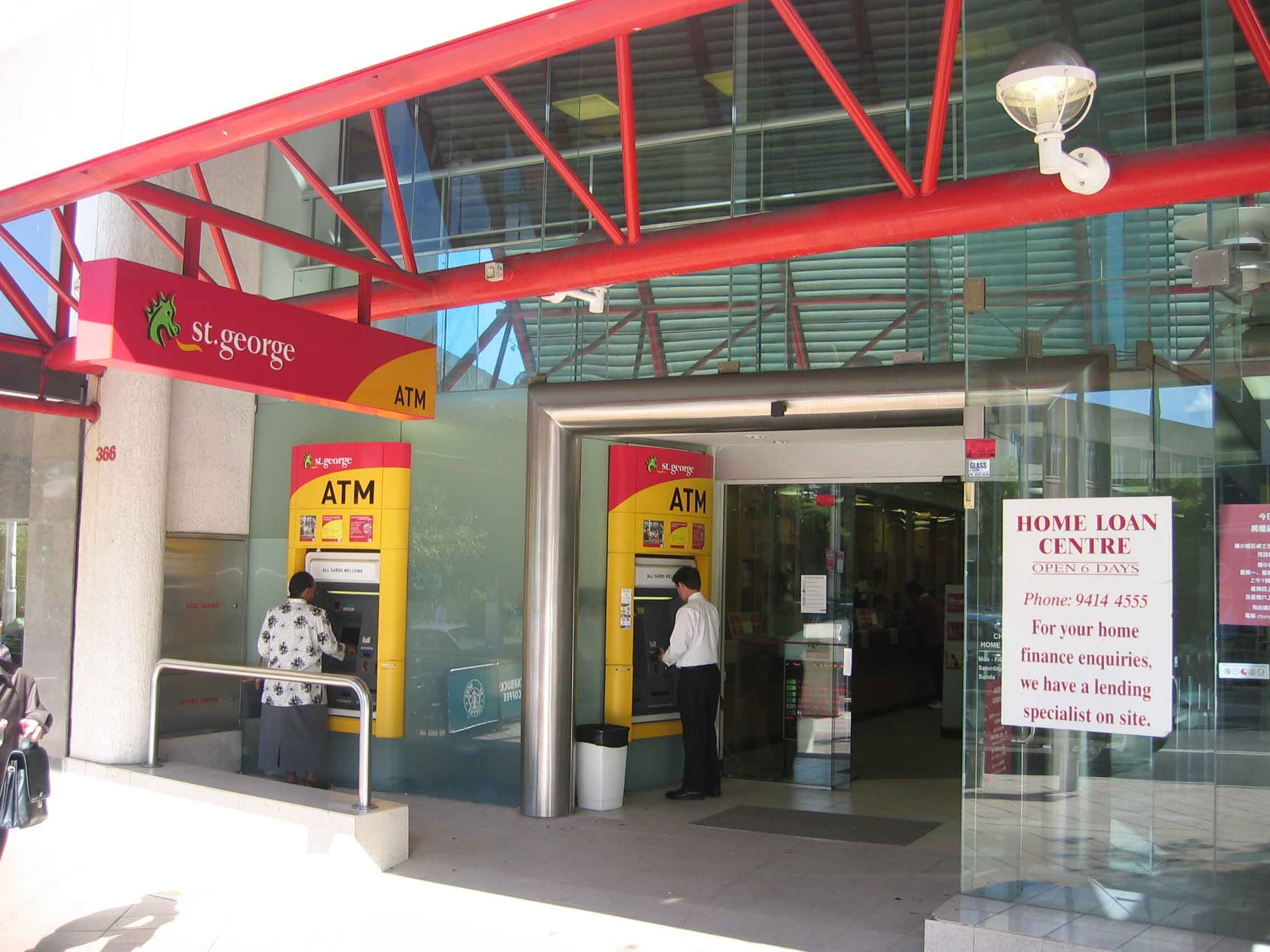
St.George Bank branch in Chatswood, Sydney, 6 April 2005

The "good bank" was acquired by the Advance Bank, who kept it operating as a separate entity under the name of the Bank of South Australia, trading as BankSA.

In 1991 St.George made its first interstate acquisition by buying the Victorian Savings and Loan Society, which had branches in a number of regional cities and towns.

Three years later in 1994 St.george bought the retails commercial bank and finance divisions of Barclays Bank Australia, incorporating 550 staff and 18 branches into the group.

Advance Bank (and its BankSA subsidiary) was in turn taken over in 1997 by St.George Bank.

Like Advance Bank, St.George has continued to run BankSA as a separate entity – it has 55 branches in metropolitan Adelaide, 66 in rural South Australia (totalling 121 overall in the state, more than any other bank in South Australia), four in the Northern Territory and one in Queensland.

On 1 November 2006, St.George Bank posted a net profit of A$1bn for 2005/06, a 17.9 per cent increase on the previous year, and a record profit for the bank. At the time of its acquisition by Westpac in 2008, St.George Bank Limited (as it was then known) was the fifth largest bank operating in Australia.

In 2016, St George Bank moved to its present headquarters in Tower 2 of the International Towers complex in the central Sydney area of Barangaroo.

=== Merger with Westpac ===
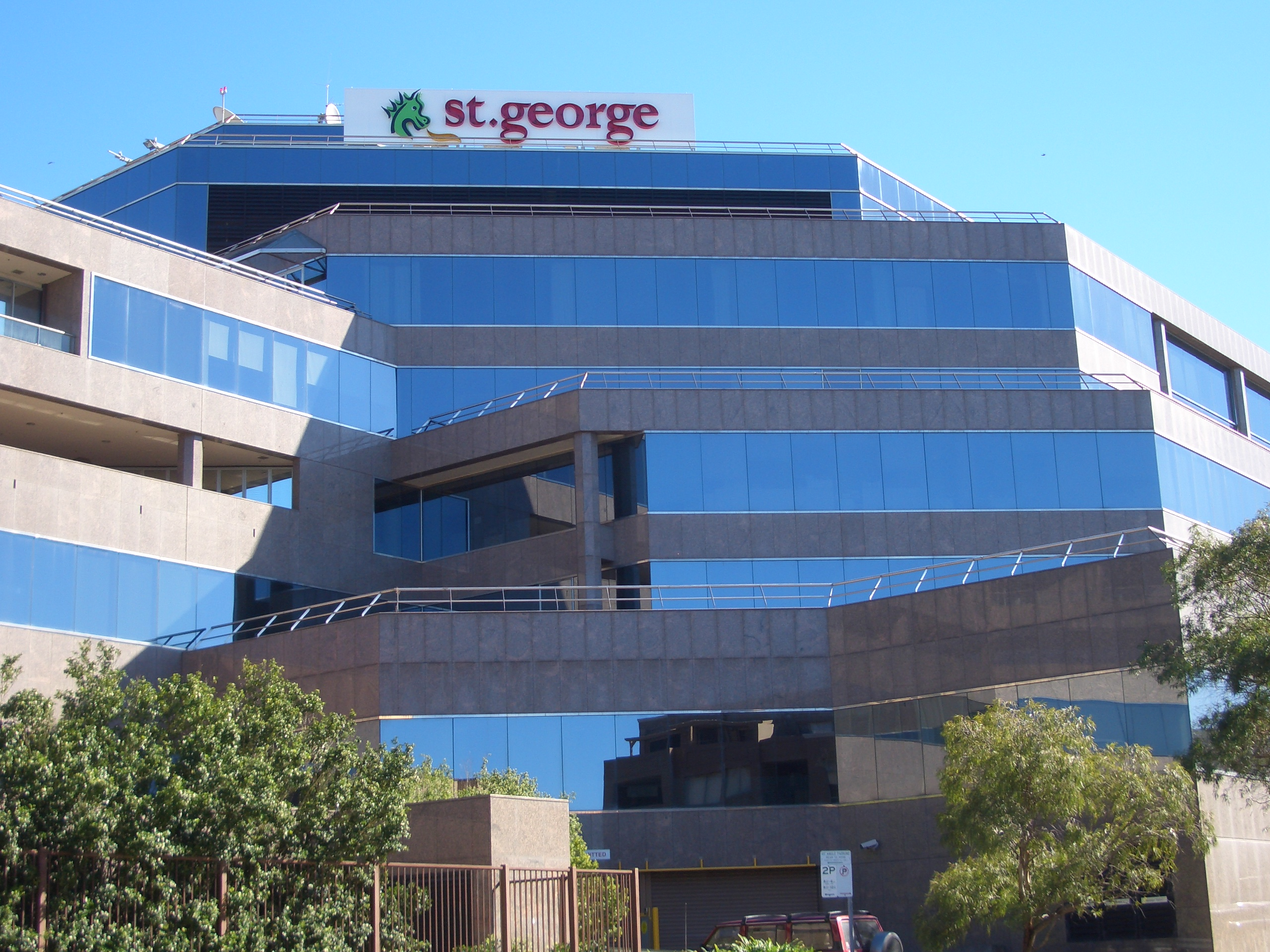
St.George Bank's former headquarters in Kogarah, Sydney

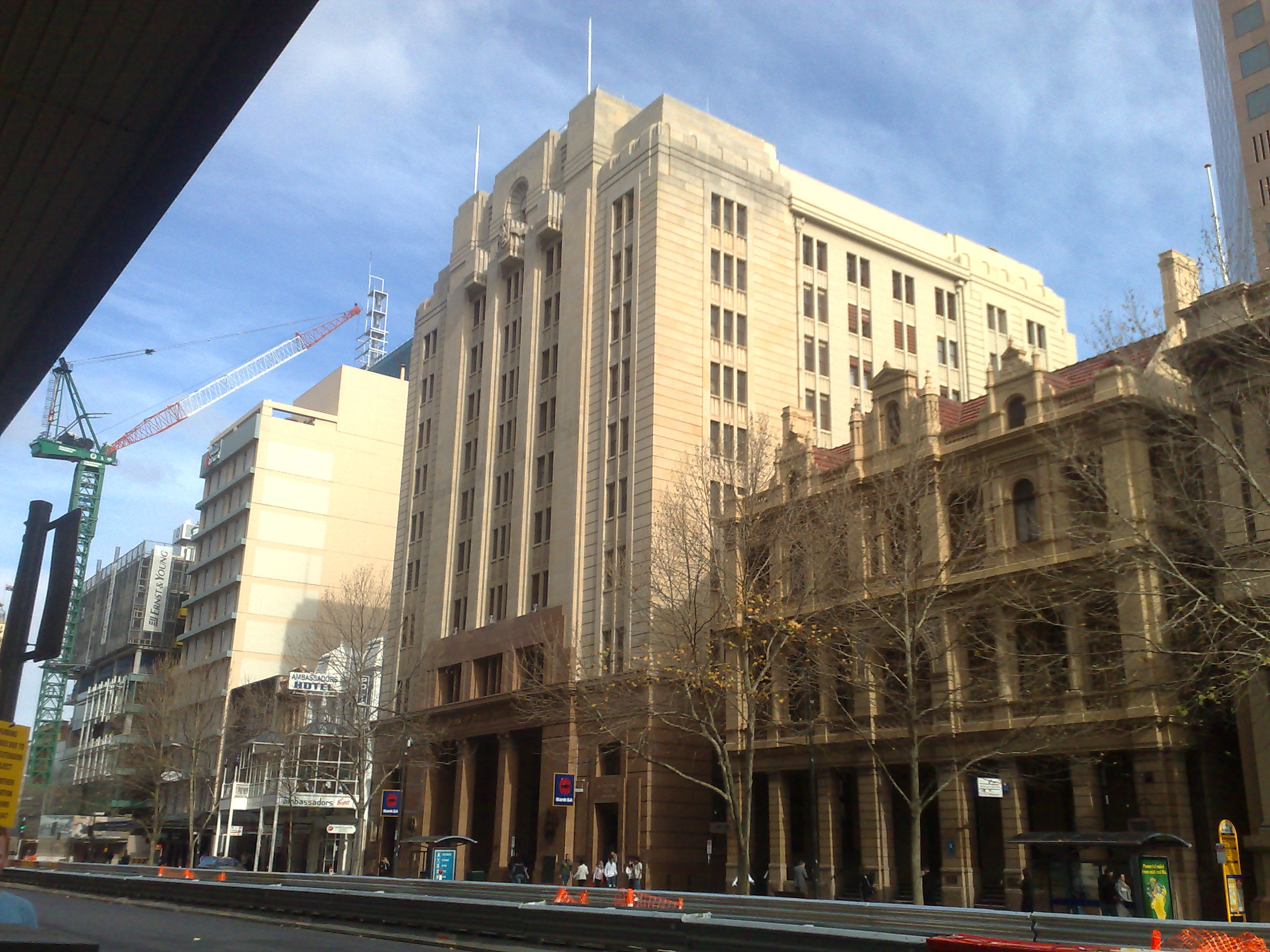
BankSA head office on King William Street, Adelaide

On 14 November 2007, Paul Fegan was announced as the new CEO of the St.George Bank, to replace Gail Kelly who had departed on 17 August 2007 to become CEO of Westpac.

On 9 May 2008, Westpac and St.George released communications outlining an intention to merge, which was approved by St.George shareholders on 13 November 2008, and upheld by the Australian Federal Court on 17 November 2008. Immediately following the court decision, Paul Fegan announced his resignation as CEO and managing director. St.George, and BankSA, became a subsidiary of Westpac on 1 December 2008.

The all-stock deal valued St.George at A$18.6 billion (US$17.5 billion), or A$33.10 a share, a premium of 28.5% to the closing price of St.George shares on 9 May in Australia. St.George shareholders received 1.31 Westpac shares for each St.George share and owned 28.1% of the new entity.

Upon completion of the merger with Westpac, Greg Bartlett (former group executive in charge of St.George Institutional and Business Bank) was appointed CEO of the bank, reporting to Westpac's then-CEO, Gail Kelly.

=== Relaunch of Bank of Melbourne ===
The Bank of Melbourne is a subsidiary of Westpac Banking Corporation, and was relaunched in August 2011. Previously, Westpac Banking Corporation had purchased the old Bank of Melbourne business in 1997 (a separate and independently operating building society located in Melbourne), and after some preliminary steps, subsequently closed its doors in 2002 and merged the remaining operations under the Westpac banner. The relaunched Bank of Melbourne replaced the St.George Bank brand completely throughout Victoria.

=== Recent years ===
In late 2010, Greg Bartlett announced that he would step down as chief executive officer in December after a long and successful tenure with the company. Rob Chapman (managing director of BankSA) would be appointed in the role.

Since coming to office, Rob Chapman has led St.George Bank in conjunction with, and with support from its parent, Westpac Banking Corporation, on a multibranded strategy which has seen St.George take Group business units such as RAMS and the relaunched Bank of Melbourne underneath its banner. The bank is now commonly referred to as the St.George Banking Group.

== Market positioning ==
St.George typically promotes itself as more friendly and customer-service-oriented than the "big four" banks operating nationally in Australia, although it is now a part of the Westpac Group. The bank was previously recognised as a customer service leader in third party surveys, but the 2010 CHOICE consumer survey showed customer satisfaction was on par with the "big four", lagging behind small credit providers.

Despite its roots as a building society specialising in home and consumer lending, today the bank provides funding to a variety of specialist industries and market segments including commercial property construction and development, invoice discounting, interest rate hedging, foreign exchange, trade finance and automotive finance (formerly the Barclay Bank Business). The Automotive Finance division also operates under St.George Finance Limited and St.George Motor Finance Limited (a subsidiary of St.George Bank) and has been rebranded in Victoria under the relaunched Bank of Melbourne.

== Offshore ==
St.George has moved parts of its back office work to India. In 2007, cards and loan services work was transferred to IBM in Bangalore, and most recently 22 Kogarah jobs went to India, bringing the total to about 122. This is in addition to the approximately 70 information technology jobs that had been moved to the Indian firms Tata Consultancy Services and Hindustan Computers Limited.

In more recent times, St.George bank has begun to reverse the trend to offshore processing, bringing card operations back to Australia.

== See also ==
- Banking in Australia
- List of banks
- List of banks in Australia
- List of banks in Oceania
