= BankSA =

Australian bank

- Formerly: Savings Bank of South Australia (est. 1848); State Bank of South Australia; Bank of South Australia
- Company type: Subsidiary
- Industry: Finance and insurance
- Founded: 1984; 42 years ago
- Headquarters: Adelaide, South Australia
- Area served: South Australia & Northern Territory
- Products: Personal banking, business banking and insurance
- Parent: Westpac
- Website: Official website

BankSA, formerly known as the Bank of South Australia, the State Bank of South Australia and the Savings Bank of South Australia is the largest bank in South Australia. It is a subsidiary of Westpac.

== History ==
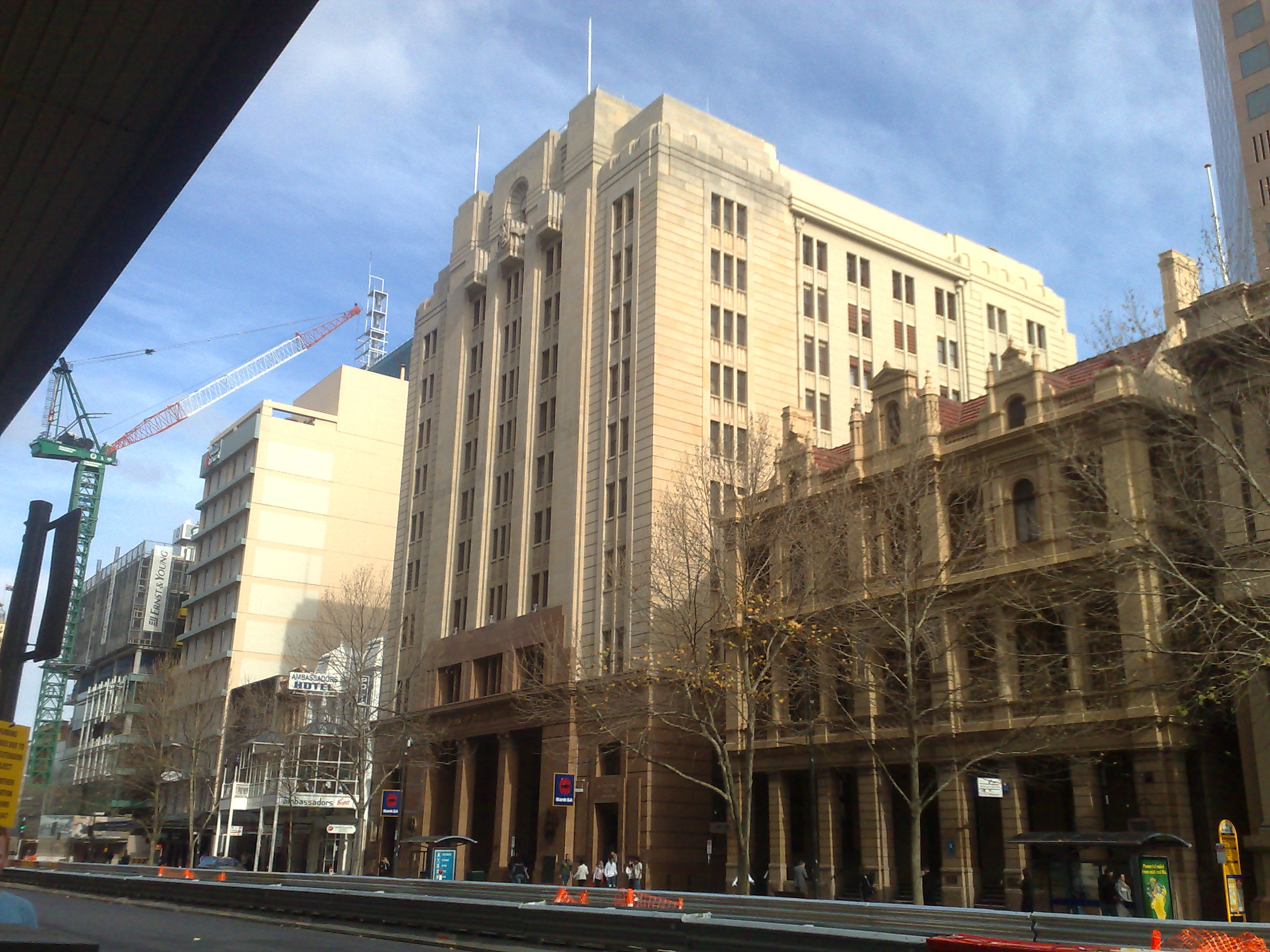
BankSA head office (completed 1943)

The Savings Bank of South Australia was established in the colony of South Australia on 11 March 1848 by sole employee John Hector. The first deposit comprised the life savings of an Afghan shepherd. The first premier of the colony, B. T. Finniss, was a trustee of the bank's inaugural board, and F. H. Robe, Lieutenant Governor of the colony, was president of the bank.

The Savings Bank of South Australia later merged with the former State Bank of South Australia (established 1896), becoming the new State Bank, owned by the Government of South Australia, in 1984.

The State Bank of South Australia was compartmentalised and bought by The Advance Bank due to deteriorating loan book and financial management. Prior to a bailout by the Government of South Australia, the Savings Bank was on the verge of collapse, which was hastened by the 1991 Royal Commission into The Organisation Of Public State Funds of South Australia. Advance Bank was purchased by St. George Bank in 1997 and the State Bank became part of the greater Westpac Corporation after the merger with St. George Bank.

== Today ==
BankSA is a wholly owned entity of St George Bank, which is owned by the Westpac Banking Corporation. Westpac is a publicly listed ASX private company with an Australian Financial Services Licence (AFSL). Both BankSA and Westpac are a part of the Australian Prudential Banking Deposit Scheme, which gives government assurances of all deposits placed into the bank in the event of financial crises.

== Technology and digital banking ==
Westpac and synonymously BankSA launched online banking services via internet and smartphone application on 5 December 2015.

== Adelaide Fringe partnership ==
In November 2005, the State Bank began its sponsorship of Australia's biggest arts festival, the Adelaide Fringe, with a A$1.4 million partnership until 2010. This sponsorship was renewed, and BankSA was the Fringe's principal partner until 2022.

== Further local alliances ==
BankSA is a private company that also extends its banking services to government and public institutions, and fellow private businesses, including the entities listed below:

- Law Society of South Australia
- Country Fire Service Volunteers' Association
- Australian Medical Association
- Port Adelaide Football Club
- Local South Australian accounting, financial planning, legal and real estate firms

== Implications in Royal Commissions ==
BankSA has not been the subject of Royal Commission findings; however, it did have an indirect history in two separate Royal Commissions. The 1991 Royal Commission in South Australia determined that the State Bank of South Australia had an underperforming loan book due to weak lending rules and operational inefficiencies, which led to a government bailout. As a result, the State Bank of South Australia had to separate and sell off the profitable part of its bank to Advance Bank, which was acquired by Westpac in 2008.

Westpac, was implicated in the Banking Royal Commission of 2017 and was ordered to pay the largest penalty of $1.3 billion for money laundering. BankSA was not directly implicated in any penalty or criminal action.

== See also ==
- Banking in Australia
- List of banks
- List of banks in Australia
- List of banks in Oceania
