= Advance Bank =

Former Australian retail bank

- Company type: Public company
- Industry: Banking; Financial services
- Predecessor: NSW Permanent Building & Investment Society
- Founded: 1939
- Defunct: 1997
- Fate: Merged with St George Bank
- Successor: St George Bank
- Headquarters: New South Wales, Australia
- Area served: Australia
- Products: Retail banking Commercial banking Asset management
- Subsidiaries: BankSA

The Advance Bank was an Australian bank that existed from 1985 until 1997, when it merged with St George Bank. It is not related to Advance Bank AG of Germany (which was shut down by Allianz in 2003).

It was established as the NSW Permanent Building & Investment Society in 1939.

In 1982, it established a funds management division, Advance Asset Management, which is now a specialist asset management business within Westpac. "Its focus is on asset allocation and risk management, implemented through a multi-manager process, providing investment opportunities across a range of asset classes, including shares, property, fixed interest and cash."

The building society was demutualised in 1985 and became known as the Advance Bank.

In 1995, Advance Bank acquired the State Bank of South Australia, which it continued to run as a separate business unit as BankSA.

Advance Bank (and its BankSA subsidiary) was taken over in 1997 by St George Bank, itself another former building society. St George Bank was then taken over by Westpac in 2008.
