= Transaction authentication number =

One-time password used in banking

A transaction authentication number (TAN) is used by some online banking services as a form of single use one-time passwords (OTPs) to authorize financial transactions. TANs are a second layer of security above and beyond the traditional single-password authentication.

TANs provide additional security because they act as a form of two-factor authentication (2FA). If the physical document or token containing the TANs is stolen, it will be useless without the password. Conversely, if the login data are obtained, no transactions can be performed without a valid TAN.

== Classic TAN ==
TANs often function as follows:

1. The bank creates a set of unique TANs for the user. Typically, there are 50 TANs printed on a list, enough to last half a year for a normal user; each TAN being six or eight characters long.
2. The user picks up the list from the nearest bank branch (presenting a passport, an ID card or similar document) or is sent the TAN list through mail.
3. The password (PIN) is mailed separately.
4. To log on to their account, the user must enter user name (often the account number) and password (PIN). This may give access to account information but the ability to process transactions is disabled.
5. To perform a transaction, the user enters the request and authorizes the transaction by entering an unused TAN. The bank verifies the TAN submitted against the list of TANs they issued to the user. If it is a match, the transaction is processed. If it is not a match, the transaction is rejected.
6. The TAN has now been used and will not be recognized for any further transactions.
7. If the TAN list is compromised, the user may cancel it by notifying the bank.

However, as any TAN can be used for any transaction, TANs are still prone to phishing attacks where the victim is tricked into providing both password/PIN and one or several TANs. Further, they provide no protection against man-in-the-middle attacks, where an attacker intercepts the transmission of the TAN, and uses it for a forged transaction, such as when the client system becomes compromised by some form of malware that enables a malicious user. Although the remaining TANs are uncompromised and can be used safely, users are generally advised to take further action, as soon as possible.

== Indexed TAN (iTAN) ==
Indexed TANs reduce the risk of phishing. To authorize a transaction, the user is not asked to use an arbitrary TAN from the list but to enter a specific TAN as identified by a sequence number (index). As the index is randomly chosen by the bank, an arbitrary TAN acquired by an attacker is usually worthless.

However, iTANs are still susceptible to man-in-the-middle attacks, including phishing attacks where the attacker tricks the user into logging into a forged copy of the bank's website and man-in-the-browser attacks which allow the attacker to secretly swap the transaction details in the background of the PC as well as to conceal the actual transactions carried out by the attacker in the online account overview.

Therefore, in 2012 the European Union Agency for Network and Information Security advised all banks to consider the PC systems of their users being infected by malware by default and use security processes where the user can cross-check the transaction data against manipulations like for example (provided the security of the mobile phone holds up) mTAN or smartcard readers with their own screen including the transaction data into the TAN generation process while displaying it beforehand to the user (chipTAN). iTANs were banned by the EU in September of 2019.

== Indexed TAN with CAPTCHA (iTANplus) ==
iTANplus is a variant of the iTAN method that presents the user a CAPTCHA prior to entering the iTAN. In the background of the CAPTCHA, the transaction data and also data deemed unknown to a potential attacker, such as the user's birthdate, is shown. This is intended to make it hard (but not impossible) for an attacker to forge the CAPTCHA.

iTANplus was used by some German banks to reduce the risk of man-in-the-middle attacks before iTANs were banned by the EU in September of 2019. Some Chinese banks have also deployed a TAN method similar to iTANplus. A recent study shows that these CAPTCHA-based TAN schemes are not secure against more advanced automated attacks.

== Mobile TAN (mTAN) ==
mTANs are used by banks in Austria, Bulgaria, Czech Republic, Germany, Hungary, Malaysia, the Netherlands, Poland, Russia, Singapore, South Africa, Spain, Switzerland and some in New Zealand, Australia, UK, and Ukraine. When the user initiates a transaction, a TAN is generated by the bank and sent to the user's mobile phone by SMS. The SMS may also include transaction data, allowing the user to verify that the transaction has not been modified in transmission to the bank.

However, the security of this scheme depends on the security of the mobile phone system. In South Africa, where SMS-delivered TAN codes are common, a new attack has appeared: SIM Swap Fraud. A common attack vector is for the attacker to impersonate the victim, and obtain a replacement SIM card for the victim's phone from the mobile network operator. The victim's user name and password are obtained by other means (such as keylogging or phishing). In-between obtaining the cloned/replacement SIM and the victim noticing their phone no longer works, the attacker can transfer/extract the victim's funds from their accounts. In 2016 a study was conducted on SIM Swap Fraud by a social engineer, revealing weaknesses in issuing porting numbers.

In 2014, a weakness in the Signalling System No. 7 used for SMS transmission was published, which allows interception of messages. It was demonstrated by Tobias Engel during the 31st Chaos Communication Congress. At the beginning of 2017, this weakness was used successfully in Germany to intercept SMS and fraudulently redirect fund transfers.

Also the rise of smartphones led to malware attacks trying to simultaneously infect the PC and the mobile phone as well to break the mTAN scheme.

== pushTAN ==
pushTAN is an app-based TAN scheme by German Sparkassen banking group reducing some of the shortcomings of the mTAN scheme. It eliminates the cost of SMS messages and is not susceptible to SIM card fraud, since the messages are sent via a special text-messaging application to the user's smartphone using an encrypted Internet connection. Just like mTAN, the scheme allows the user to cross-check the transaction details against hidden manipulations carried out by Trojans on the user's PC by including the actual transaction details the bank received in the pushTAN message. Although analogous to using mTAN with a smartphone, there is the risk of a parallel malware infection of PC and smartphone. To reduce this risk the pushTAN app ceases to function if the mobile device is rooted or jailbroken. In late 2014 the Deutsche Kreditbank (DKB) also adopted the pushTAN scheme.

== TAN generators ==
=== Simple TAN generators ===
The risk of compromising the whole TAN list can be reduced by using security tokens that generate TANs on-the-fly, based on a secret known by the bank and stored in the token or a smartcard inserted into the token.

However, the TAN generated is not tied to the details of a specific transaction. Because the TAN is valid for any transaction submitted with it, it does not protect against phishing attacks where the TAN is directly used by the attacker, or against man-in-the-middle attacks.

=== ChipTAN / Sm@rt-TAN / CardTAN ===
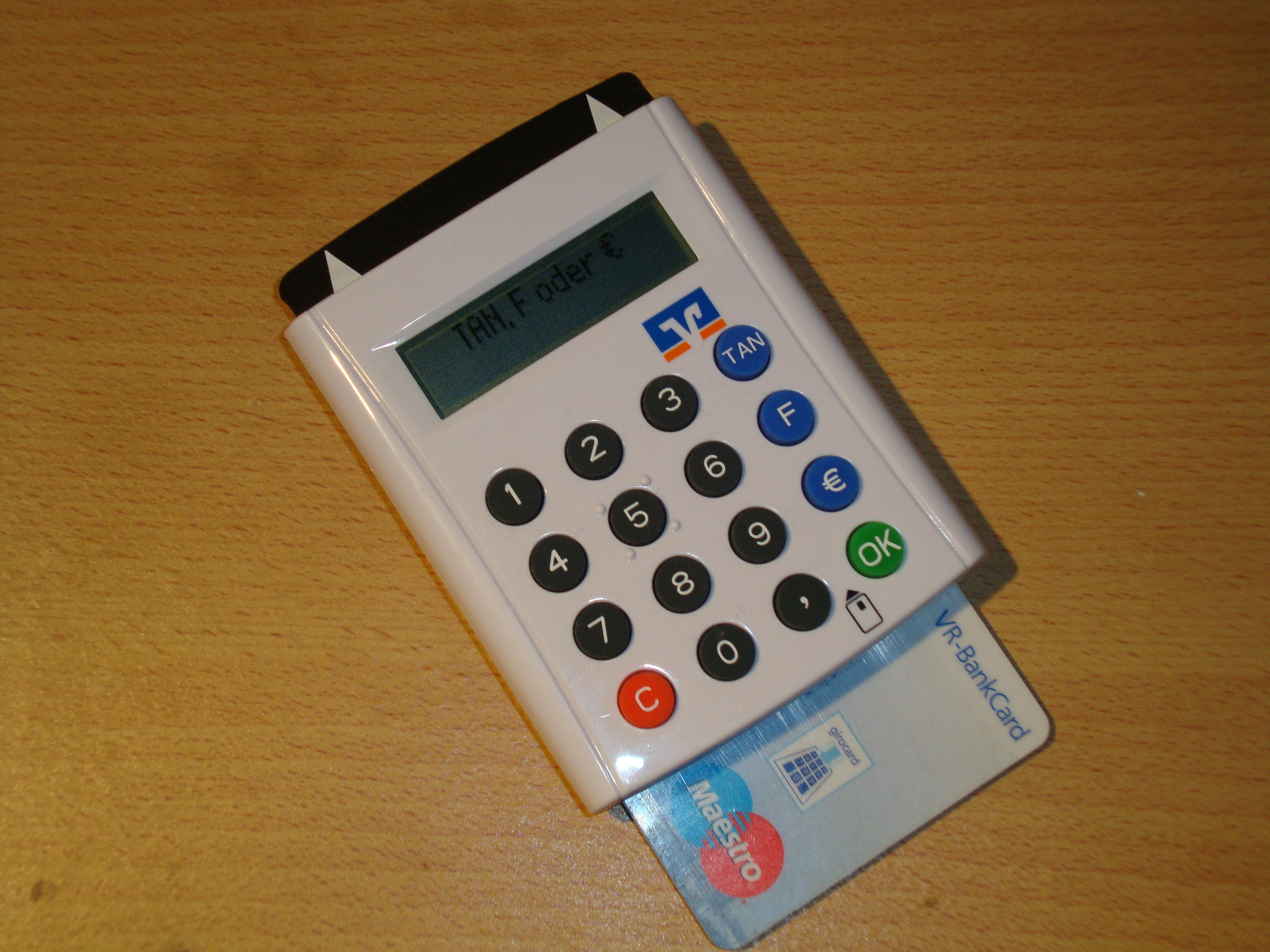
ChipTAN generator (optical version) with bank card attached. The two white arrows mark the borders of the barcode on the computer screen.

ChipTAN is a TAN scheme used by many German and Austrian banks. It is known as ChipTAN or Sm@rt-TAN in Germany and as CardTAN in Austria, whereas cardTAN is a technically independent standard.

A ChipTAN generator is not tied to a particular account; instead, the user must insert their bank card during use. The TAN generated is specific to the bank card as well as to the current transaction details. There are two variants: In the older variant, the transaction details (at least amount and account number) must be entered manually. In the modern variant, the user enters the transaction online, then the TAN generator reads the transaction details via a flickering barcode on the computer screen (using photodetectors). It then shows the transaction details on its own screen to the user for confirmation before generating the TAN.

As it is independent hardware, coupled only by a simple communication channel, the TAN generator is not susceptible to attack from the user's computer. Even if the computer is subverted by a Trojan, or if a man-in-the-middle attack occurs, the TAN generated is only valid for the transaction confirmed by the user on the screen of the TAN generator, therefore modifying a transaction retroactively would cause the TAN to be invalid.

An additional advantage of this scheme is that because the TAN generator is generic, requiring a card to be inserted, it can be used with multiple accounts across different banks, and losing the generator is not a security risk because the security-critical data is stored on the bank card.

While it offers protection from technical manipulation, the ChipTAN scheme is still vulnerable to social engineering. Attackers have tried to persuade the users themselves to authorize a transfer under a pretext, for example by claiming that the bank required a "test transfer" or that a company had falsely transferred money to the user's account and they should "send it back". Users should therefore never confirm bank transfers they have not initiated themselves.

ChipTAN is also used to secure batch transfers (Sammelüberweisungen). However, this method offers significantly less security than the one for individual transfers. In case of a batch transfer the TAN generator will only show the number and total amount of all transfers combined – thus for batch transfers there is little protection from manipulation by a Trojan. This vulnerability was reported by RedTeam Pentesting in November 2009. In response, as a mitigation, some banks changed their batch transfer handling so that batch transfers containing only a single record are treated as individual transfers.

== See also ==
- One-time password
- Security token
