= Pension fund =

Program, fund, or scheme that provides retirement income

A pension fund, also known as a superannuation fund in some countries, is any program, fund, or scheme which provides retirement income. The U.S. Government's Social Security Trust Fund, which oversees $2.57 trillion in assets, is the world's largest public pension fund. Pension funds typically have large amounts of money to invest and are the major investors in listed and private companies. They are especially important to the stock market where large institutional investors dominate. The largest 300 pension funds collectively hold about USD6 trillion in assets. In 2012, PricewaterhouseCoopers estimated that pension funds worldwide hold over $33.9 trillion in assets (and were expected to grow to more than $56 trillion by 2020), the largest for any category of institutional investor ahead of mutual funds, insurance companies, currency reserves, sovereign wealth funds, hedge funds, or private equity.

== Classifications ==
=== Open vs. closed pension fund ===
Open pension funds support at least one pension plan with no restriction on membership while closed pension funds support only pension plans that are limited to certain employees. Closed pension funds are further subclassified into:

- Single employer pension funds
- Multi-employer pension funds
- Related member pension funds
- Individual pension funds

=== Public vs. private pension funds ===
A public pension fund is one that is regulated under public sector law while a private pension fund is regulated under private sector law. In certain countries, the distinction between public or government pension funds and private pension funds may be difficult to assess. In others, the distinction is made sharply in law, with very specific requirements for administration and investment. For example, local governmental bodies in the United States are subject to laws passed by the states in which those localities exist, and these laws include provisions such as defining classes of permitted investments and a minimum municipal obligation.

== Plan design ==
Pension funds usually finance pension plans whose benefits are defined by plan rules, employment contracts, trust deeds, statute, or other governing documents. Plan design affects how contributions are set, how benefits are calculated, and which party bears investment, inflation, salary, and longevity risk.

=== Defined benefit (DB) ===
A defined benefit plan promises a formula-based pension (for example, a percentage of final or career-average earnings multiplied by years of service). The benefit is specified in advance, and the plan sponsor is responsible for ensuring sufficient funding to meet the promise. In DB schemes, investment and longevity risks largely remain with the sponsor (often an employer or a public plan).

=== Defined contribution (DC) ===
A defined contribution plan specifies the contributions paid into an individual account; the eventual benefit depends on contributions and investment returns rather than a pre-set formula. In DC schemes, investment and longevity risks are typically borne by the member. "Money purchase" plans are a canonical DC form.

=== Differences between DB and DC ===
DB and DC plans differ primarily in (i) the promise (benefit vs. contribution), (ii) the risk bearer (sponsor vs. member), and (iii) portability and funding mechanics. These distinctions underpin regulatory and policy debates tracked in international monitoring such as OECD Pensions at a Glance.

=== Accompanying insurance within pension funds ===
Occupational and personal pension plans frequently bundle or administer ancillary risk benefits that insure members and their dependants against contingencies other than old age. Supervisory guidance notes that, in addition to a retirement objective, plans may provide disability, sickness, and survivors' benefits.

==== Death benefits ====
Many plans include death-in-service cover, paying a lump sum (often structured via group life arrangements) or a survivors' pension to a spouse, partner, or dependants. UK regulatory guidance recognizes schemes that provide lump-sum death benefits and the option to establish separate "group life only" schemes for this purpose.

The tax treatment of death benefits and unspent pension balances varies by jurisdiction and over time; for example, the UK has announced that most unused pension funds and certain death benefits will fall within the deceased's estate for inheritance tax from 6 April 2027.

==== Survivors' pensions and spousal protections ====
In systems governed by ERISA in the United States, the default form of benefit for married participants in many employer plans is a Qualified Joint and Survivor Annuity (QJSA), which continues payments over both lifetimes. A Qualified Preretirement Survivor Annuity (QPSA) protects the spouse if the participant dies before retirement. The U.S. Internal Revenue Service specifies that QJSA survivor percentages typically range from 50% to 100% of the participant's annuity.

Plan terms and local law determine eligibility of non-marital partners. Some employers extend survivor options to domestic partners as a matter of policy even when not legally required.

==== Disability and ill-health benefits ====
Pension funds may provide disability (invalidity) pensions or permit ill-health early retirement, often defined with reference to an inability to perform suitable work. U.S. law permits "qualified disability benefits" within pension plans (subject to plan and tax rules), although detailed regulation differs between DB and DC contexts.

Some arrangements include a waiver of contributions/premiums during qualifying disability so that accruals or insurance cover continue while the member is unable to work. Such waiver provisions are common in group life or rider form.

== How they work ==
It is important to distinguish between pension plans, funds, and firms. A pension plan is a benefits program set up and sustained by an employer or an employee group. They are managed by state or private firms as well as pension funds. Pension funds are financial mechanisms that provide retirement income for employees after their working life. They work by accumulating contributions from employers, and sometimes employees, which are then invested to grow over time. Upon retirement, employees receive benefits, typically calculated as a percentage of their average salary during their working years. For instance, consider a scenario where a pension scheme offers a payment equivalent to 1% of an individual's average salary over the last five years of their employment for each year they served with the employer. Thus, if an employee worked for 35 years at the company and had an average final salary of $60,000, they would be entitled to an annual pension of $21,000. It is important to point out that one cannot usually take early withdrawals or loans from pensions. Public sector pensions, like the California Public Employees' Retirement System (CalPERS), often include cost-of-living escalators and can be more generous than private sector pensions. Private pension plans are regulated by federal laws such as the Employee Retirement Income Security Act (ERISA) and are insured by the Pension Benefit Guaranty Corporation (PBGC), which guarantees benefits if a pension plan fails.

== How pension funds invest their money ==
Pension funds can make investments into stocks, bond, real estate, and other assets. However, they have to be prudently managed compared to other types of funds due to their lower risk tolerance. For many years, they mainly invested capital into stable stocks and bonds. In order to keep high returns, with changing market conditions, they started to invest into other assets. As of 2023, many pension funds are moving away from managing active stock portfolios towards passive investment methods, focusing on index funds and exchange-traded funds (ETFs) that replicate market indices. Additionally, there's an increasing trend to diversify into alternative assets like commodities, high-yield bonds, hedge funds, and real estate. Newer investment tools for pension funds include asset-backed securities, such as those tied to student loans or credit card debt, which are used to boost returns. Investing in private equity is also rising in popularity; these are long-term investments in non-public companies, aimed at achieving substantial profits through eventual sales when these companies reach maturity. Furthermore, real estate investment trusts (REITs) are becoming a frequent choice for pension funds due to their passive investment approach in the real estate sector. Direct investments in commercial properties like office buildings, warehouses, and industrial parks are also prevalent.

Many governments around the world have established public pension systems that are partially or fully funded by investments rather than relying solely on payroll taxes. This approach helps to ensure the long-term solvency of these pension programs. Some examples of governments that use pension fund investments are:

- Australia: The Australian Government's Future Fund was established in 2006 to help cover the government's superannuation (pension) liabilities. It invests in a range of asset classes, including equities, fixed income, and alternative investments, to grow the fund's assets over time.
- Canada: The Canada Pension Plan Investment Board (CPPIB) manages the investment of the Canada Pension Plan's assets. It invests in a diversified portfolio of stocks, bonds, real estate, and other assets to generate returns and secure the future of the public pension system.
- Norway: The Norwegian Government Pension Fund Global, also known as the Oil Fund, is one of the largest sovereign wealth funds in the world. It invests the surplus revenues from Norway's oil and gas industry to help finance the country's public pension system and other government expenses.
- Singapore: The Central Provident Fund (CPF) in Singapore is a compulsory social security savings plan that requires contributions from both employers and employees. The CPF board invests these funds to generate returns and ensure the long-term financial stability of the pension system.
- Sweden: The Swedish Pension System (Allmänna pensionssystemet) has a buffer fund, the AP Funds, that invests in various financial instruments to supplement the pay-as-you-go pension contributions and ensure the system's long-term sustainability.

These are just a few examples of governments that have adopted an investment-based approach to managing their public pension systems. By diversifying and growing their pension fund assets, these countries aim to mitigate the risks of running out of money in the future as their populations age.

== Governance ==
Pension funds are important financial institutions which manage the retirement savings of millions. Effective governance in these entities is crucial not only to safeguard these funds but also to ensure that they meet their future obligations to pensioners. The governance structures, strategies, and practices of pension funds significantly influence their stability, performance, and the trust of their stakeholders. Proper governance ensures that decisions are made transparently and that fund managers are accountable to stakeholders, including employees, retirees, and employers.

According to the OECD Guidelines for Pension Fund Governance, the governance structure should clearly identify and separate operational and oversight responsibilities. Every pension fund should have a governing body, accountable to the pension plan members and beneficiaries. This body is ultimately responsible for ensuring adherence to the terms of the arrangement and the protection of the best interest of plan members and beneficiaries. The governing body should also meet minimum suitability standards to ensure a high level of integrity, competence, experience, and professionalism. Additionally, there should be adequate internal controls in place to ensure compliance with the law.

== Challenges ==
Many pension funds have problems with governance. In Hungary, where pension funds are established as not-for-profit institutions, there is evidence that the governing body is generally ineffective in looking after the best interests of its members. Most funds are established by financial institutions that find it easy to promote their candidates to the fund's supervisory board. Some pension funds in the United States have also been the subject of governance problems too, as well as in other countries.

== History of pension funds ==
The first concepts of providing retirement benefits have roots in ancient civilizations such as Rome and Greece. The pension system as we know it originated in the 19th century. In 1889, German Chancellor Otto von Bismarck started an early modern pension scheme. His goal was to help older German´s citizens. However, this idea came from the United States of America. In 1875 American Express Company introduced its own pension plan. During the early 20th century pension plans for public employees were growing, which resulted in the creation of a U.S. federal retirement plan, known as Social Security, in 1935. After World War II, pension funds became the primary tool for providing retirement benefits, which was supported by the growth of labour unions. By the 1970s, they held large amounts of financial assets and had evolved to be significant participants in financial markets, but in the 1980s and 1990s pension funds faced significant challenges. The stock market crash in 1987 and the recession in the early 1990s had a negative impact on pension funds. Furthermore, demographic shifts and rising life expectancies placed pressure on these funds to sustain retirement benefits over extended durations.

== Relationship with welfare states ==
The development of pension funds varies significantly across countries partly due to differences in welfare state design. Countries with generous pay-as-you-go public pension systems tend to have smaller private pension fund sectors, as workers expecting public retirement benefits save less privately. This crowding-out effect helps explain why pension fund assets as a percentage of GDP vary dramatically across OECD countries, from over 140% in countries like the Netherlands and Denmark to under 10% in countries with comprehensive public pension provision.

== Regulation ==
In the United States, pension plans are regulated mainly by The Employee Retirement Income Security Act 1974 (ERISA). It provides framework for the regulation of employee pension and plans which are private pension funds offering. In 2006 was introduced The Pension Protection Act (PPA). This act come with new funding requirements for defined pension plans. As well as with new rules for calculating plan assets and liabilities.

Pension funds in European Union are regulated by Directive 2003/41/EC, also known as the IORP directive. This directive was recast and adopted in December 2016. It should promote long-term investment via occupational pension funds. Additionally, beneficiaries and members should now be better informed about their entitlements, address challenges faced by occupational pension funds operating across borders, and foster long-term investments in economic activities that boost growth, enhance the environment, and increase employment opportunities.

== Largest pension funds ==
The following table lists the largest public pension funds by total assets by the SWF Institute.

Country	Fund	Assets (billion US$)	Reporting period	Inception	Origin
United States	Federal Old-age and Survivors Insurance Trust Fund (Social Security)	$2456	2024	1935	Taxation
Norway	Government Pension Fund of Norway	$2267	2026	1990	Oil
Japan	Government Pension Investment Fund	$2026	2026	2006	Non-commodity
United States	Military Retirement Fund	$1507	2024	1984	Employer Contribution
United States	Civil Service Retirement and Disability Fund	$1062	2024	1920	Employer & Employee Contribution
South Korea	National Pension Service (NPS)	$944	2025	1988	Non-commodity
United States	Thrift Savings Plan (TSP)	$737	2022	1986	Employer & Employee Contribution
Netherlands	Stichting Pensioenfonds ABP (ABP)	$620 (€530)	2025	1922	Non-commodity
Canada	Canada Pension Plan and CPP Investment Board (CPPIB)	$570	2022	1965	Non-commodity
Singapore	Central Provident Fund	$513	2025	1955	Employer & Employee Contribution
Canada (Quebec)	Caisse de dépôt et placement du Québec (The Caisse, or CDPQ)	$402	2022	1965	Non-commodity
United States (California)	California Public Employees' Retirement System (CalPERS)	$389	2020	1932	Non-commodity
Malaysia	Employees Provident Fund	$362	2025	1951	Employer & Employee Contribution
United States (California)	California State Teachers' Retirement System (CalSTRS)	$282	2021	1913	Non-commodity
China	National Social Security Fund	$251	2015	2000	Non-commodity
Canada (Ontario)	Ontario Teachers' Pension Plan (OTPP)	$247	2022	1989	Non-commodity
Australia	Australian Retirement Trust (ART)	$234	2025	2022	Employer & Employee Contribution
Australia	AustralianSuper	$221	2024	2006	Employer & Employee Contribution
Netherlands	Stichting Pensioenfonds Zorg en Welzijn (PFZW, formerly PGGM)	$183 (€162)	2022	1969	Non-commodity
Sweden	AP-funds	$182	2023	1960	Taxation
Chile	AFP	$160	2014	1980	Non-commodity
India	Employees' Provident Fund Organisation (EPFO)	$340	2019	1952	Employer & Employee Contribution
Kuwait	Public Institution for Social Security Fund	$134	2024	1976	Oil & Employee Contribution
Russia	Russian National Wealth Fund	$125 ^{[38]}	2020	2008	Oil
Denmark	Arbejdsmarkedets Tillægspension (ATP)	$106	2023	1964	Employee Contribution
Canada (Ontario)	Ontario Municipal Employees Retirement System (OMERS)	$124	2022	1962	Non-commodity
South Africa	Government Employees Pension Fund (GEPF)	$112 (ZAR1426b)		1996	Non-commodity
Brazil	Caixa de Previdencia dos Funcionários do Banco do Brasil (PREVI)	$80		1904	Finance
United States (Ohio)	State Teachers Retirement System of Ohio (STRS Ohio)	$79.8	2017	1919	Defined Benefit Pension
France	AGIRC – ARRCO	$70	2015	2001	Non-commodity
India	National Pension System (NPS)	$85	2021	2004	Non-commodity
France	Pensions Reserve Fund (France) (NPRF)	$56		2001	Non-commodity
Ireland	National Pension Reserve Fund (NPRF)	$30		2001	Non-commodity

=== Public reserve funds and other large arrangements ===
The OECD treats public pension reserve funds as a related but distinct category. In its 2025 pension indicators, the OECD reported that public pension reserve funds held US$6.9 trillion in assets in OECD countries at the end of 2024. The largest reserve was the United States social security trust fund, with US$2.5 trillion, followed by Japan's Government Pension Investment Fund with US$1.7 trillion. The OECD notes that these reserves support public pay-as-you-go pension arrangements and do not belong to a specific group of individuals.

The United Kingdom illustrates the difficulty of comparing pension schemes with pension funds. The UK government states that, among the main public service pension schemes, only the Local Government Pension Scheme is funded. Other main public service schemes, including the Civil Service, NHS, Teachers, Police, and Fire schemes, are unfunded and do not invest contributions in a fund. Official statistics for England and Wales reported that Local Government Pension Scheme funds had a market value of £402.3 billion at the end of March 2025, based on data from 86 administering authorities covering 87 funds. This is an aggregate of local funds rather than a single fund in a global ranking.

UK private-sector funded occupational pension schemes are also large in aggregate. The Office for National Statistics reported that private-sector defined benefit and hybrid schemes had a market value of £1.120 trillion at 30 September 2025. The Pensions Regulator counted 5,190 private defined benefit and hybrid schemes in 2024, with 9.424 million memberships.

Large named UK arrangements include the Universities Superannuation Scheme, which reported £76.8 billion in assets under management at 31 March 2025, and Nest, which reported investing £49.7 billion on behalf of 13.8 million workers. Legal & General reported that the Legal & General Mastertrust reached £30 billion in assets under management on 1 January 2025, which it described as the first UK commercial master trust to reach that milestone. The Pension Protection Fund is a related statutory compensation arrangement rather than an ordinary pension scheme. It pays compensation to members of eligible defined benefit schemes in specified employer insolvency cases, and reported £31 billion in assets under management at 31 March 2025.

== By country ==
=== Australia ===
==== Government ====
- Commonwealth Superannuation Scheme (old scheme for federal civil servants)
- Military Superannuation and Benefits Scheme (current scheme for Australian Defence Force personnel)
- Public Sector Superannuation accumulation plan (current scheme for federal civil servants)
- Public Sector Superannuation Scheme (old scheme for federal civil servants)
- State Super (for New South Wales state civil servants)

==== Industry (not-for-profit) ====
- Australian Retirement Trust
- AustralianSuper
- AustSafe Super
- CareSuper
- Cbus
- Energy Super
- FIRSTSUPER
- HESTA
- Hostplus
- legalsuper
- LUCRF Super
- Media Super
- MTAA Super (Spirit Super)
- NGS Super
- REI Super
- Rest Super
- TWUSUPER
- UniSuper

==== Private ====
- ANZ Australian Staff Superannuation Scheme (for employees of ANZ Bank)

=== Brazil ===
- Aceprev
- Baneses
- Banesprev
- Centrus
- FAPES
- Forluz
- Funcef
- Fundação Banrisul
- Fundação CESP
- Fundação Itaubanco
- Petros
- PREVI – Caixa de Previdência dos Funcionários do Banco do Brasil (the closed private pension fund for employees of the Brazilian federal government-owned bank)
- Sistel
- Valia

=== Canada ===
==== Government ====
- AIMCo
- Alberta Pensions Services Corporation
- British Columbia Investment Management Corporation (BCIMC) 455
- Caisse de dépôt et placement du Québec
- Canada Pension Plan (investments directed by the Canada Pension Plan Investment Board)
- Healthcare of Ontario Pension Plan (HOOPP)
- Ontario Teachers Pension Plan
- Ontario Municipal Employees Retirement System (OMERS)
- Public Sector Pension Investment Board (PSP Investments)
- OPSEU Pension Trust (OPTrust)
- Ontario Pension Board (OPB)
- TTC Pension Plan (TTCPP)
- University Pension Plan (UPP)

==== Private ====
- Colleges of Applied Arts and Technology Pension Plan (CAAT)
- Boilermakers Pension Fund Trust
- Labourers' Pension Fund of Central and Eastern Canada (LIUNA)
- Teamsters Canadian Pension Plan
- Telecommunication Workers Pension Plan
- UFCW Canadian Pension Plan

=== Chile ===
- AFP Modelo
- Chile pension system

=== China ===
- Social Security Fund (China) – managed by National Council for Social Security Fund

=== Czech Republic ===
- Pension funds form the third pillar of the Czech Republic's pension system and allow people to invest regularly and voluntarily over the long term with state support and tax relief.

==== Penzijní připojištění (Pension Plan, PP) ====
- Pension Plan could be negotiated until the end of 2012. These funds are called "Transformed Funds" (TF). These carry a guarantee of non-negative appreciation in each year of saving. Therefore, their investment strategy is also conservative and based on investing in bonds and money market instruments. The fund credits appreciation only once a year.
- The client does not hold any unit certificates or pension units, but, on the basis of the funds invested, state contributions and, where appropriate, employer contributions, holds a share in the fund's assets, which appreciate in value over time and are completely separate from the pension company.

==== Doplňkové penzijní spoření (Supplementary Pension Savings, DPS) ====
- Supplementary Pension Savings have been available since the beginning of 2013. They operate on a similar principle to unit trusts, except that they are set up by pension companies and the client receives pension units instead of unit certificates.
- The main difference from the client's point of view is the possibility to choose the investment strategy of their savings. The three main strategies are:
  - Conservative funds – a strategy suitable for clients who wish to invest safely in money market instruments.
  - Balanced (mixed) funds – a strategy suitable for clients who wish to take advantage of investing in government bonds and stocks within a single fund.
  - Dynamic funds – a strategy suitable for clients who wish to invest exclusively in stocks and expect high returns that beat inflation. In this case, a high risk of volatility must be taken into account. This risk can be mitigated by regular savings.

==== Dlouhodobý investiční produkt (Long-term Investment Product, DIP) ====
- As of 1 January 2024, a long-term investment product was launched, thanks to which it is possible to invest in shares, bonds or investment funds. In the context of Pension Plan (in Transformed Funds) or Supplementary Pension Savings, you can only invest in participatory funds offered by the pension company. You have no control over how the pension company handles the money you invest. In contrast, in Long-term Investment Product you can set up your investments as you see fit and you can change the composition of your investments over time.

=== Greece ===
==== Government ====
- Public Employees Pension Fund

==== Private ====
- TAPILTAT, the Fund for Mutual Assistance of the Employees of Ioniki Bank and Other Banks, the multi-employer auxiliary pension fund

=== Hong Kong ===
- Mandatory Provident Fund Scheme (MPF Schemes)
- Occupational Retirement Schemes (ORSO Schemes)

=== India ===
- Employees' Provident Fund Organisation – a statutory social security body of the Government of India that administers a mandatory defined-contribution Provident Fund Scheme, Pension Scheme and a death/disability Insurance Scheme. Provident Fund is applicable for employees across all non-government establishments (private as well as state-owned companies and public sector banks). EPFO is the largest social security organisation in India with the total fund size being well over ₹ 28 lakh crore (US$340 billion) as of 2025.
- National Pension Scheme – a defined-contribution–based pension scheme launched by the Government of India open to all citizens of India on a voluntary basis and mandatory for the employees of central government (except Indian Armed Forces) who are appointed on or after 1 January 2004. Indian citizens between the age of 18 and 70 are eligible to join.

=== Iran ===
- Civil Servants Pension Fund Iranian Social Security

=== Italy ===
According to the 2023 annual relation of COVIP_{it}, at the end of 2022 Italian private supplementary pension funds managed 206.5 billion euros (equal to 10.8% of GDP and 4% of Italian families financial activities).

INPS is the main Italian public pension fund. There exist also private pension funds, managed by private banks, and ruled by collective agreements in the public and private sectors.

=== Japan ===
- See Japan Pension Service
- Government Pension Investment Fund, Japan (GPIF, 年金積立金管理運用独立行政法人)

=== Malaysia ===
- Employees Provident Fund in Malaysia, known as Kumpulan Wang Simpanan Pekerja (KWSP), is a government-managed retirement savings scheme. It provides financial security for private sector employees and non-pensionable public sector employees upon retirement. Both employees and employers make mandatory contributions to the fund throughout the employee's working life.

The contributions are invested by the EPF in various sectors, such as equities, bonds, and property, to generate returns. Members can withdraw their savings under specific conditions, such as retirement at the age of 55, for healthcare, housing, or education. The EPF also allows partial withdrawals before retirement for certain approved purposes. It has total of around 265 billion USD of asset under management as of end 2023.)

- Retirement Fund (Incorporated) is Malaysia's public sector pension fund. Established in 2007, its primary role is to manage and invest funds for the retirement benefits of public sector employees, ensuring the sustainability of pensions. KWAP receives contributions from the government and various statutory bodies, which it invests in various assets, including equities, fixed income, and real estate, to generate returns that support pension payouts. It has total of around 40 billion dollar of assets under management as of end 2023.
- Armed Forces Fund Board

=== Morocco ===
- Caisse de dépôt et de gestion
- CMR (in French)

=== Nepal ===
- Employees Provident Fund Nepal

=== Netherlands ===
- Stichting Pensioenfonds ABP (ABP)
- Stichting Pensioenfonds Zorg en Welzijn (PFZW, formerly PGGM)

=== Norway ===
- The Government Pension Fund – Global (Statens pensjonsfond – Utland)
- The Government Pension Fund – Norway (Statens pensjonsfond – Norge)

=== Oman ===
- Social Protection Fund
- Military and Security Services Pension Fund

=== Romania ===
The pension system in Romania is made of three pillars. One is the state pension (Pillar I – Mandatory), the second is a private mandatory pension where the state transfers a percentage of the contribution it collects for the public pension, and the third is an optional private pension (Pillar III – Voluntary). The Financial Supervisory Authority – Private Pension is responsible for the supervision and regulation of the private pension system.

=== Saudi Arabia ===
- General Organization for Social Insurance

=== Serbia ===
- The pension system in Serbia is made of three pillars. One is the state pension (Pillar I – Mandatory), where every insured person is obliged to pay contributions from their paycheck, the second is a voluntary state pension, where an uninsured person is voluntarily included in state pension system, and the third is an optional private pension (Pillar III – Voluntary).
- Pension and disability insurance fund

=== Singapore ===
- Central Provident Fund

=== Sri Lanka ===
- Employees' Provident Fund (Sri Lanka)
- Employees' Trust Fund

=== Switzerland ===
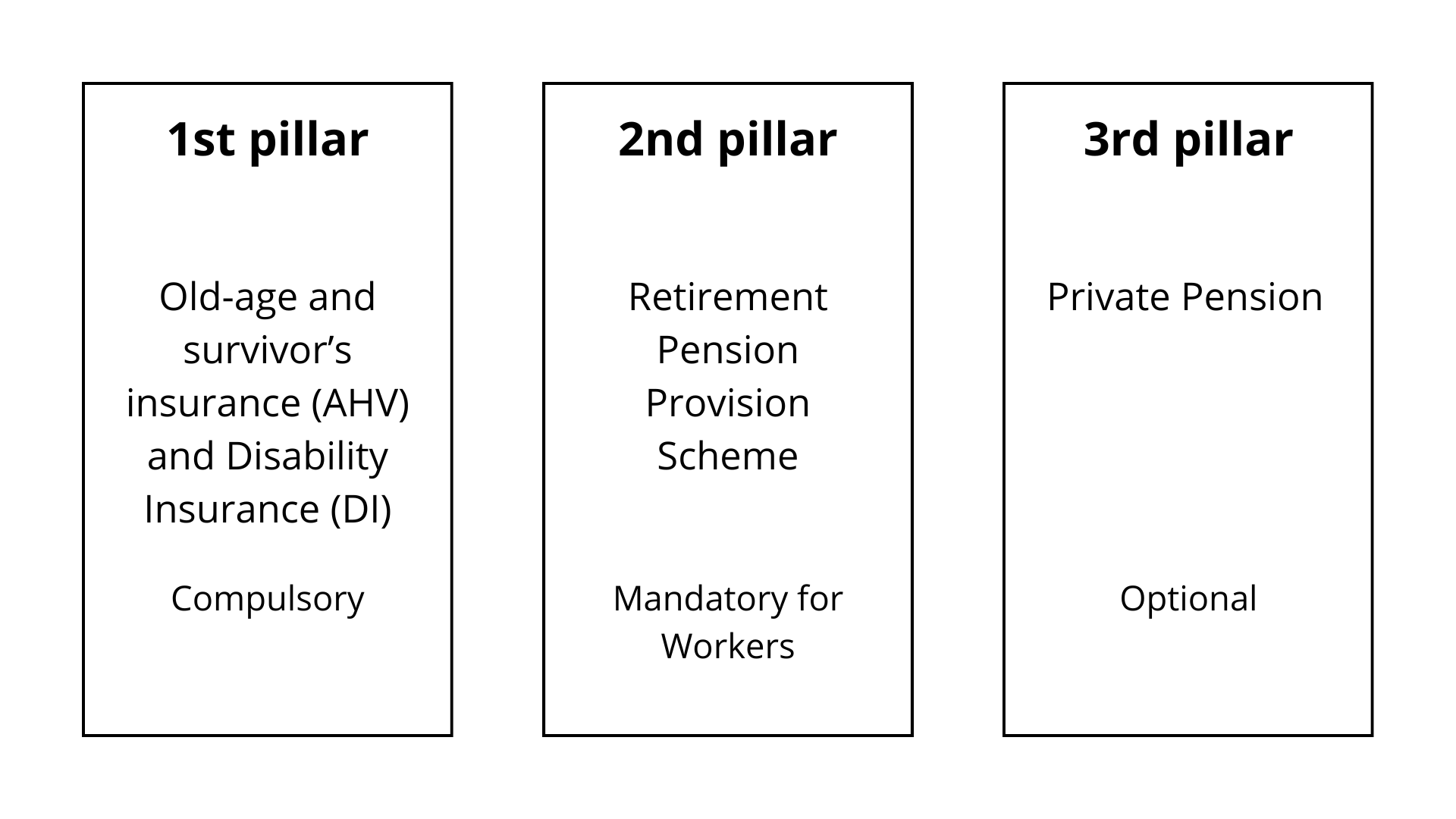
The three pillars of the Swiss pension system: 1. State pension : old-age and survivors insurance (OASI) and disability insurance (DI); 3. Occupational pension (pension funds); 3. Private pension (banks).

The Swiss pension system rests on three pillars:

1. the state-run pension scheme for the aged, orphans, and surviving spouses (old-age and survivors insurance);
2. the pension funds run by investment foundations, which are tied to employers (occupational benefit plans);
3. voluntary, private investments.

=== Turkey ===
==== Government ====
- Sosyal Güvenlik Kurumu (Social Security Institution, SGK)

Social Security Institution was established by the Social Security Institution Law No:5502 which was published in the Official Gazette No: 26173 dated 20.06.2006 and brings the Social Insurance Institution, General Directorate of Bağ-kur and General Directorate of Emekli Sandığı whose historical development are summarized above under a single roof in order to transfer five different retirement regimes which are civil servants, contractual paid workers, agricultural paid workers, self-employers and agricultural self-employers into a single retirement regime that will offer equal actuarial rights and obligations.

==== Private ====
- Armed Forces Pension Fund

OYAK (Ordu Yardımlaşma Kurumu/Armed Forces Pension Fund) provides its members with "supplementary retirement benefits" apart from the official retirement fund, T.C.Emekli Sandığı/SSK, to which they are primarily affiliated. In addition to the retirement benefit, OYAK pays "disability benefits" to the members on duty when they become partially or fully disabled as well as "death benefits" to the heirs of the deceased member if the death occurs during the member's subscription to the foundation. OYAK is incorporated as a private entity under its own law subject to Turkish civic and commercial codes. OYAK, while fulfilling its legal duties, as set in the law, also provides its members with social services such as loans, home loans and retirement income systems. The initial source of OYAK's funds is a compulsory 10 percent levy on the base salary of Turkey's 200,000 serving officers who, together with 25,000 current pensioners, make up OYAK's members. Some other Turkish private pension funds:

- YAPI ve KREDİ BANKASI A.Ş. Mensupları Yardım ve Emekli Sandığı Vakfı
- AKBANK T.A.Ş. Mensupları Tekaüt Sandığı Vakfı
- TÜRKİYE GARANTİ BANKASI A.Ş. Memur ve Müstahdemleri Emekli ve Yardım Sandığı Vakfı
- TÜRKİYE ODALAR BORSALAR VE BİRLİK PERSONELİ SİGORTA VE EMEKLİ SANDIĞI VAKFI
- TÜRKİYE İŞ BANKASI A.Ş. Mensupları Emekli Sandığı Vakfı

=== United States ===
In the United States, pension funds include schemes which result in a deferral of income by employees, even if retirement income provision is not the intent. The United States has $19.1 trillion in retirement and pension assets ($9.1 trillion in private funds, $10 trillion in public funds) as of 31 December 2016. The largest 200 pension funds accounted for $4.540 trillion as of 30 September 2009.

== See also ==
- Global assets under management
- Pension-fund activism
- Pension buyout
- Pension insurance contract
- Pension regulation
- Qualifying registered overseas pension schemes
- Sovereign wealth fund
