= Industry Super Australia =

Australian retirement savings peak body

- Logo of organisation
- Company type: Peak organisation
- Founded: 2005
- Headquarters: Sydney, Australia
- Key people: Greg Combet (Chairperson); Bernie Dean (CEO); Matthew Linden (Deputy CEO)

Industry Super Australia (ISA) is peak body for industry super funds in Australia.

It has 15 industry super funds as members, which between them hold 5 million accounts.

Not every industry super fund is a member of the peak body, but most are, including Australia's largest industry funds such as AustralianSuper, CBUS, HESTA, and HostPlus. Some funds unaffiliated with ISA still refer to themselves as 'industry super funds' for historical reasons.

The body styles itself as "a research and advocacy body for Industry SuperFunds", which aims to make the most of the retirement savings of the individual members of its member funds.

As of September 2020, the Board of ISA is chaired by Greg Combet and includes representatives from industry super funds, former (mostly Labor) state and federal ministers, and the ACTU Secretary, Sally McManus.

== Advertising campaigns ==
ISA manages collective projects on behalf of its member funds, including research, policy development, government relations and advocacy, as well as coordinating the Industry SuperFunds Joint Marketing Campaign. The campaign is responsible for a number of prominent advertising and marketing campaigns, including the long-running “Compare the Pair” television and press campaign, which has run multiple iterations over many years, has achieved household recognition throughout Australia. The campaign is currently in its 3rd generation.

The "From little things" campaign used Paul Kelly and Kev Carmody's song "From Little Things, Big Things Grow" from September 2009 until the end of 2014. After that, the Ben Lee song "We're All in This Together" would be used.

== Consolidation of accounts ==
In September 2018, ISA arranged a deal by 19 industry super funds to consolidate superannuation accounts of all of their members. Involving half a million inactive accounts containing few funds, it is estimated that it may collectively save its members around A$100 million a year in what they would otherwise pay in fees and life insurance premiums. All members of ISA, as well as REST, Equipsuper and First State Super, have signed up to the deal.

All inactive accounts containing less than A$6,000 are now automatically rolled into a central pool, managed by a specialist fund called AUSFund. If any active accounts exist for the member in question with any of the funds, the money in the inactive account is automatically transferred into that fund.

== Submissions and representations ==
Since ISA’s inception, it has made submissions to government on a number of superannuation-related topics, including:

- The Murray Inquiry (2014) into Australia’s financial systems, with particular reference to superannuation
- The Cooper Review (2010) into the superannuation system and regulatory improvements
- The Senate Standing Committee on Community Affairs covering the proposed tightening of pension eligibility
- The Trowbridge Review into potential conflicted remuneration and its effect on life insurance advice
- The Parliamentary Joint Committee on Corporations and Financial Systems Inquiry
- The Senate Economics Legislation Committee (2013) review for streamlining the Future of Financial Advice Bill.

== See also ==
- Retail Super fund
- Superannuation in Australia
