= ME Bank =

Australian direct bank

Members Equity Bank Limited
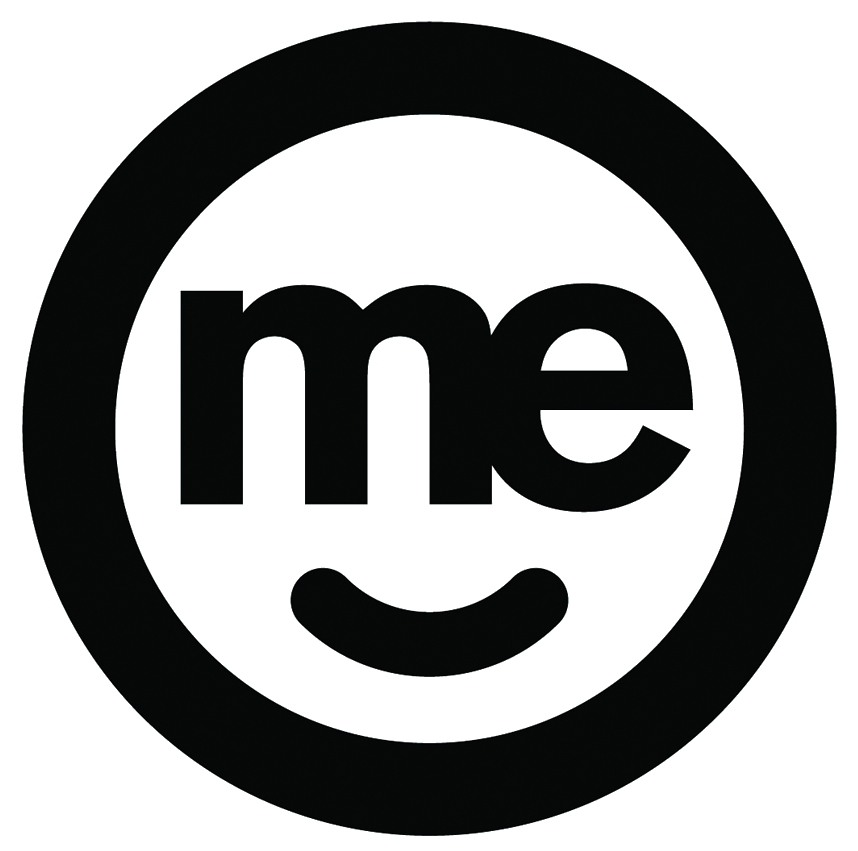
- Type: Subsidiary
- Industry: Banking
- Predecessor: Super Member Home Loans (SMHL)
- Founded: 1994
- Headquarters: Melbourne, Australia
- Area served: Australia
- Key people: Patrick Allaway (CEO)
- Total assets: ▲ A$27.300 billion
- Number of employees: 1800
- Parent: Bank of Queensland
- Website: www.mebank.com.au

ME Bank, also known as ME, is an Australian direct bank based in Melbourne. It became a subsidiary of Bank of Queensland in July 2021.

Founded in 1994 as Super Member Home Loans (SMHL) by Australia's industry superannuation funds, SMHL became Members Equity Bank in 1999, and received a banking licence from the Australian Prudential Regulatory Authority (APRA) in July 2001 and was approved by APRA to act as an authorised deposit-taking institution, authorised to accept deposits from the public.

Initially founded to offer access to home loan products, ME Bank today offers a range of low-cost banking products including home loans, savings accounts, credit cards, term deposits, and transaction accounts.

== History ==
Industry Funds Services (IFS) was founded in 1994 by a group of industry super funds.

Also in 1994, Super Member Home Loans (SMHL) was launched by the ACTU in partnership with National Mutual (later to become Axa). The primary focus of SMHL was on providing home loans to Australian members of industry super funds.

In 1998, SMHL achieved $1 billion in funds under management; and in 1999, IFS entered into an agreement with AXA to establish a 50/50 joint venture company. In 2000, IFS and Axa launched Members Equity Bank Limited, that offered other banking products as well as home loans. Members Equity Bank obtained an Australian banking licence in July 2001, and was approved to act as an authorised deposit-taking institution, authorised to accept deposits from the public.

In 2002, AXA withdrew from the joint venture, and Members Equity Bank became 100% owned by industry super funds.

In 2003, Members Equity Bank obtained a financial services licence and began offering financial services, in addition to bank deposit accounts. Also in 2003, the bank achieved $10 billion in funds under management.

In 2009, Members Equity Bank was re-branded to "ME Bank", and in 2015, 'ME Bank' was shortened to 'ME'.

IFS continues to provide fee-for-service financial planning advice for members of industry super funds.

In July 2021, the 26 industry superannuation funds that owned ME Bank, including AustralianSuper, UniSuper, Cbus, HESTA and Hostplus sold the bank to Bank of Queensland for A$1.325 billion.

== Controversy ==
In April 2020, ME Bank, owned by 26 industry super funds, altered the redraw facilities on certain legacy home loan products without prior notification to customers. This change reduced the accessible funds in these accounts, causing significant customer dissatisfaction.

The bank stated that the adjustment aimed to prevent customers from inadvertently exceeding their original repayment schedules, which could lead to financial hardship. However, the lack of communication led to regulatory scrutiny from the Australian Prudential Regulation Authority (APRA) and the Australian Financial Complaints Authority (AFCA).

In response to the backlash, ME Bank apologized and offered to reinstate the original redraw limits for affected customers upon request. Despite these efforts, the Banking Code Compliance Committee (BCCC) found the bank's actions constituted serious and systemic breaches of the Banking Code, citing poor communication and failure to rectify longstanding system issues.

The controversy culminated in the resignation of CEO Jamie McPhee in July 2020.

== Retail banking services ==
ME Bank offers customers a range of banking products and services, including transaction and savings accounts, home and personal loans, term deposits, and credit cards.

ME Bank operates as a direct bank and has no branch network. Services and support are provided over the phone, through online banking, or by a mobile salesforce of banking managers.

== See also ==
- Banking in Australia
- List of banks
- List of banks in Australia
- List of banks in Oceania
