= IFM Investors =

Australian investment management company

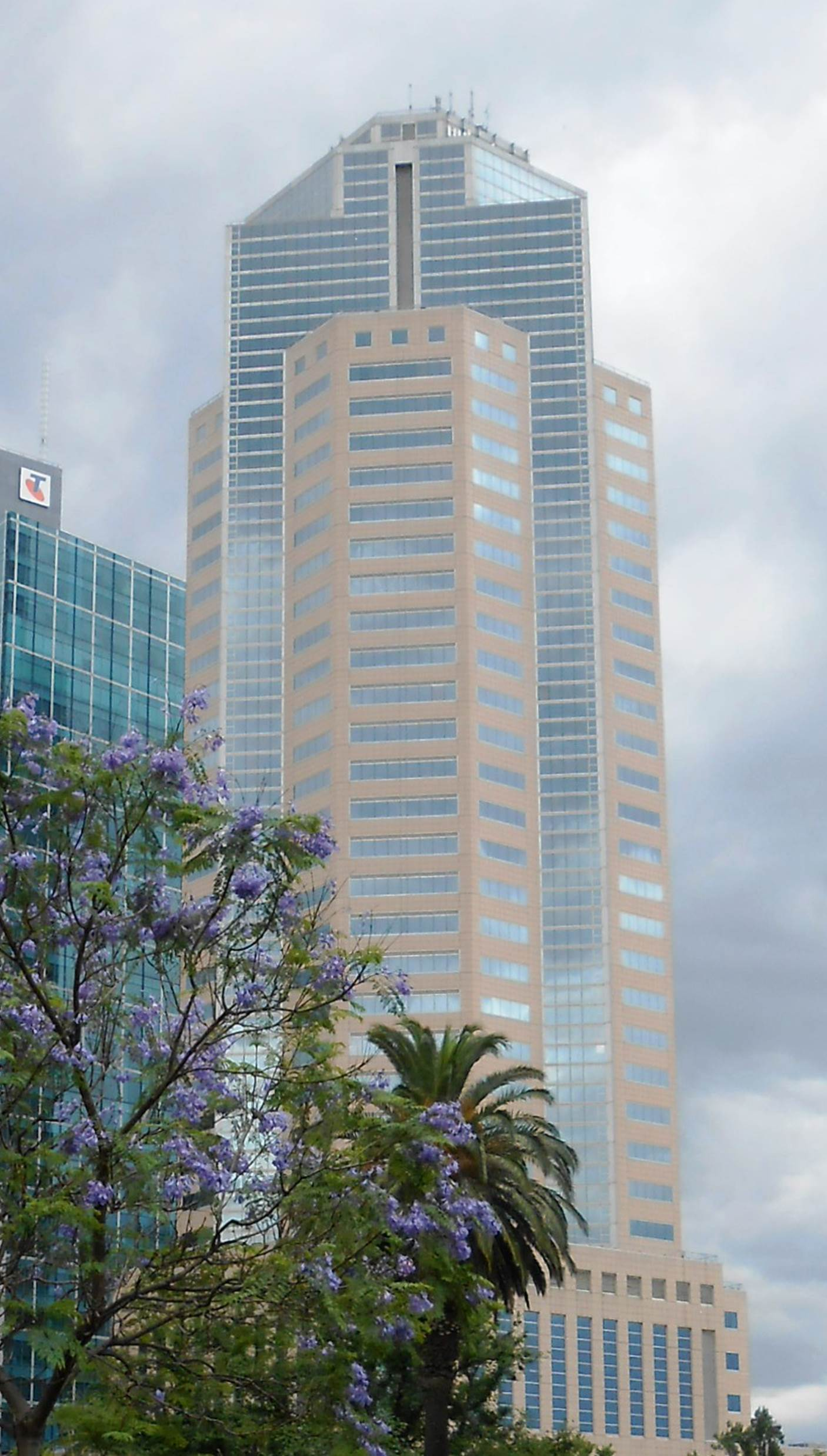
- Headquarters in Melbourne
- Formerly: Industry Funds Management (IFM)
- Type: Private
- Industry: Investment management
- Founded: 1990
- Headquarters: Melbourne, Australia
- Number of locations: 13 (2025)
- Key people: David Neal (Chief Executive); Cath Bowtell (Chair)
- Products: Investment management; Asset management; Alternative investment; Socially responsible investing
- AUM: ▲ A$232.3 billion (2025)
- Number of employees: ▲678 (2022)
- Divisions: Infrastructure; Debt Investments; Listed Equities; Private Equity
- Website: ifminvestors.com

IFM Investors is a provider of investment services, headquartered in Melbourne, Australia.

As of 31 December 2024, IFM Investors invests on behalf of more than 745 institutions worldwide, including pension, superannuation and sovereign wealth funds, universities, insurers, endowment funds and foundations.

== History ==
Established in 1990, the firm started off as the Development Australia Fund (DAF Limited). It was established to invest in growing Australian private and public companies and infrastructure assets. In 1994, Industry Funds Services (IFS) was established to provide advice and specialist investment expertise in infrastructure, private equity and Australian equities. Industry Funds Management (IFM) was created through the merger of IFS Capital Group and DAF Limited in 2004. Industry Funds Management (IFM) changed its name to IFM Investors in 2013.

In 2018, the company Fomento de Construcciones y Contratas (FCC) decided to sell 49% of the capital of its subsidiary FCC Aqualia to the IFM Global Infrastructure Fund (through Global Infraco Spain) for 1,024 million euros.

In 2024, IFM merged with the Industry Superannuation Property Trust (ISPT), adding 139 properties across Australia valued at A$20.3 billion.

== Corporate responsibilities ==
IFM Investors has been a signatory to the United Nations-supported Principles for Responsible Investment (UNPRI) since 2008 and has a Group Corporate Environmental, Social & Government Policy that determines its approach to the governance of investee entities. The firm is committed to reducing the carbon impact of its investments, targeting net zero greenhouse gas emissions across asset classes by 2050.

== Ownership ==
IFM Investors is owned by a collective of 15 Australian and one UK pension fund.

List of Owners
Fund
AustralianSuper
Australian Retirement Trust
Brighter Super
BUSSQ
CareSuper
Cbus
Equip Super
First Super
HESTA
Hostplus
Nest
NGS Super
REI Super
Team Super
UniSuper
Vision Super
