= Macquarie Centre =

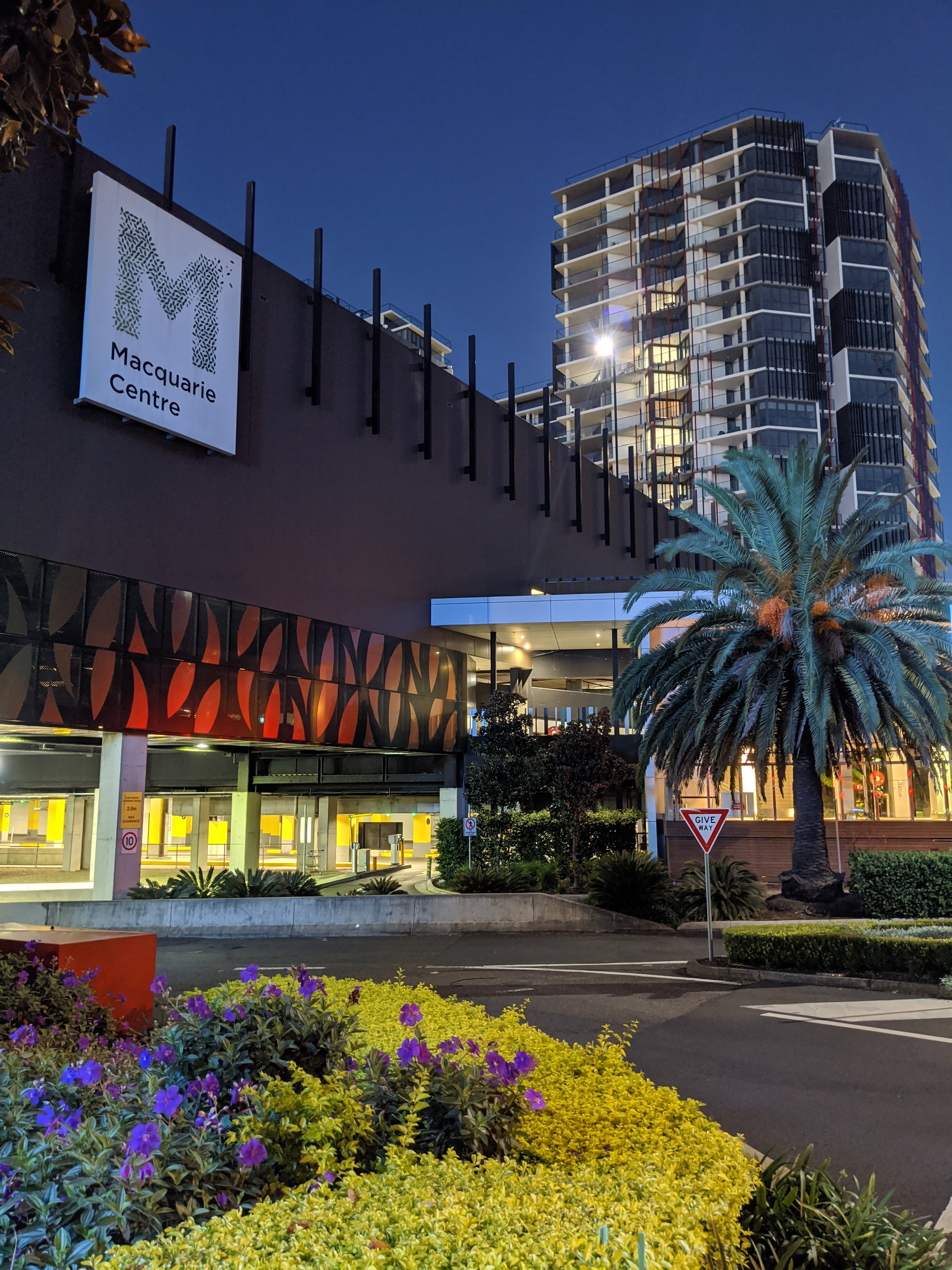
- Macquarie Centre main carpark entrance on Waterloo Road
- Location: Macquarie Park, New South Wales, Australia
- Coordinates: 33°46′37″S 151°07′14″E
- Address: Cnr Herring & Waterloo Roads
- Opened: 17 November 1981; 45 years ago
- Developer: AMP
- Manager: Dexus
- Owner: AMP Capital (50%); Cbus (25%); UniSuper (25%)
- Num. of stores: 350
- Num. of anchor tenants: 10
- Floor area: 134,900 m^{2} (1,452,052 sq ft)
- Floors: 4
- Parking: 4,900
- Public transit: Macquarie University
- Website: macquariecentre.com.au

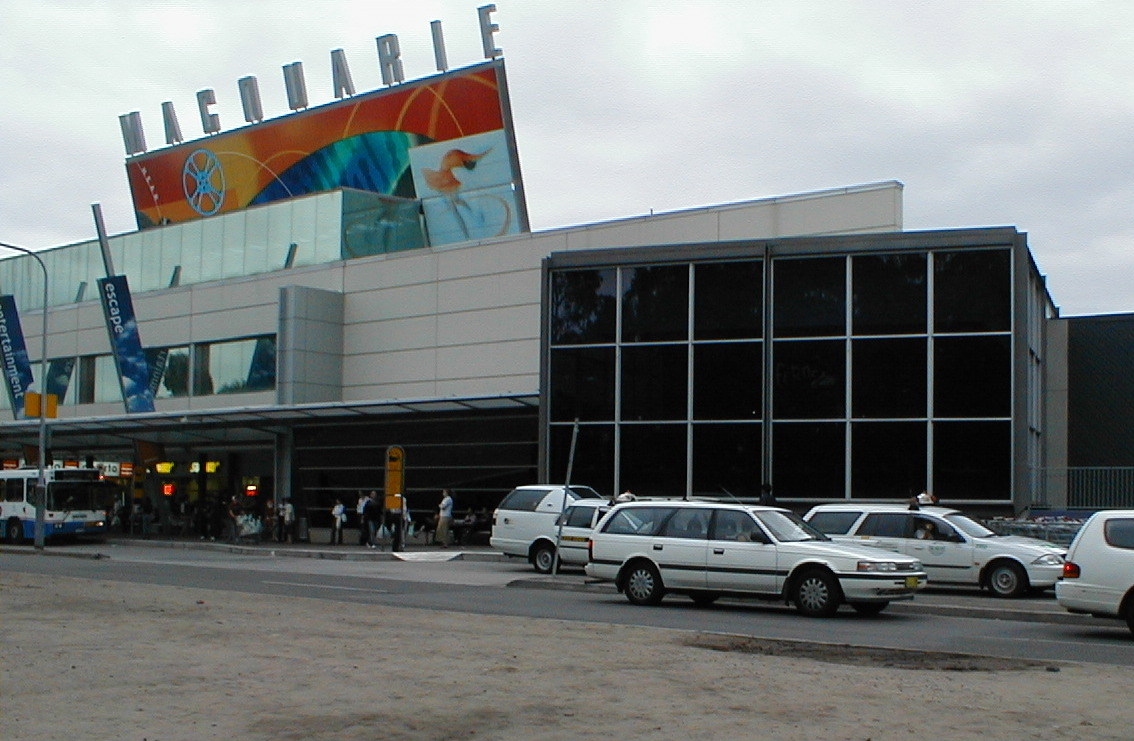
Entrance on Herring Road in 2004

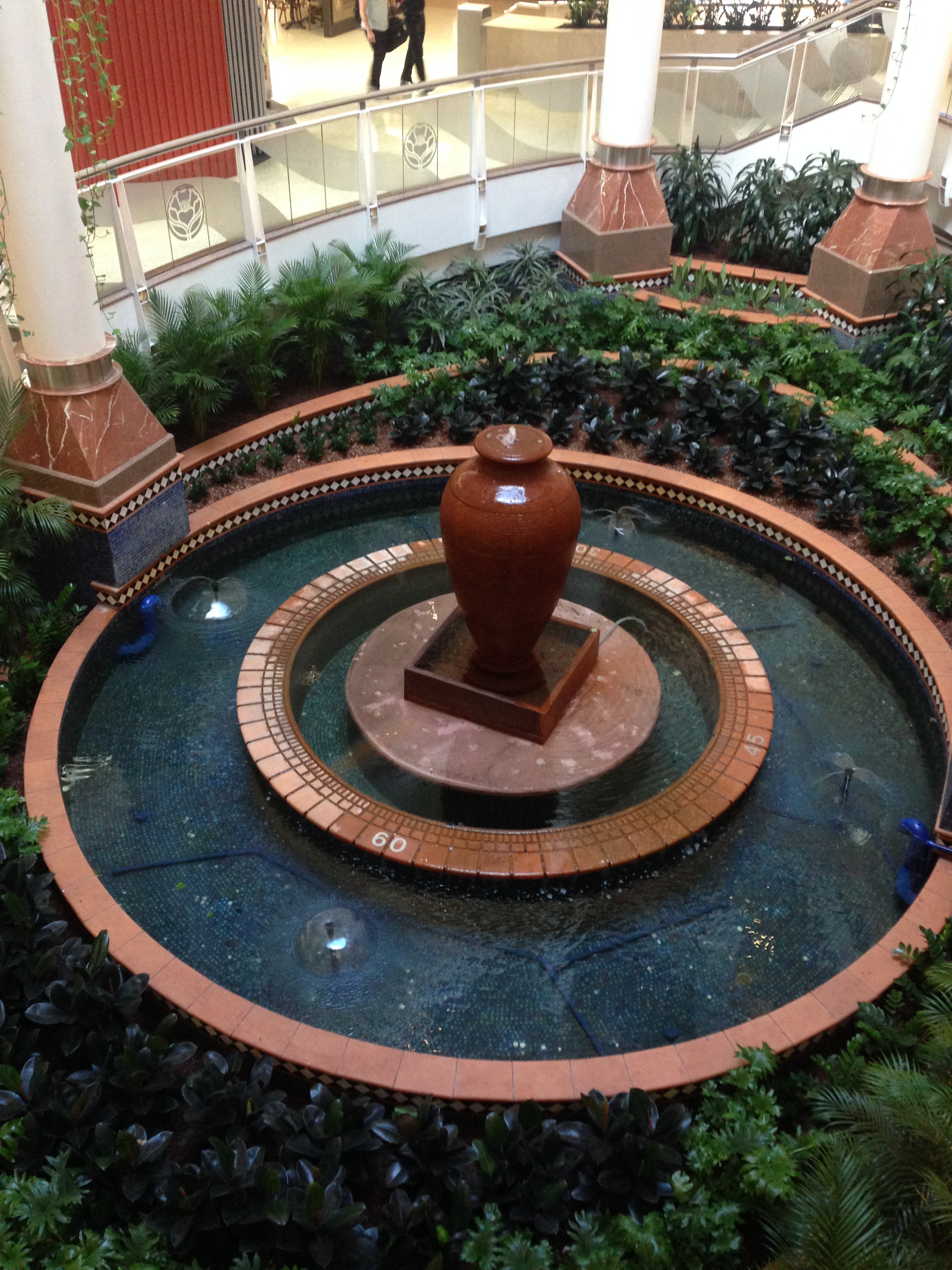
Clock Fountain

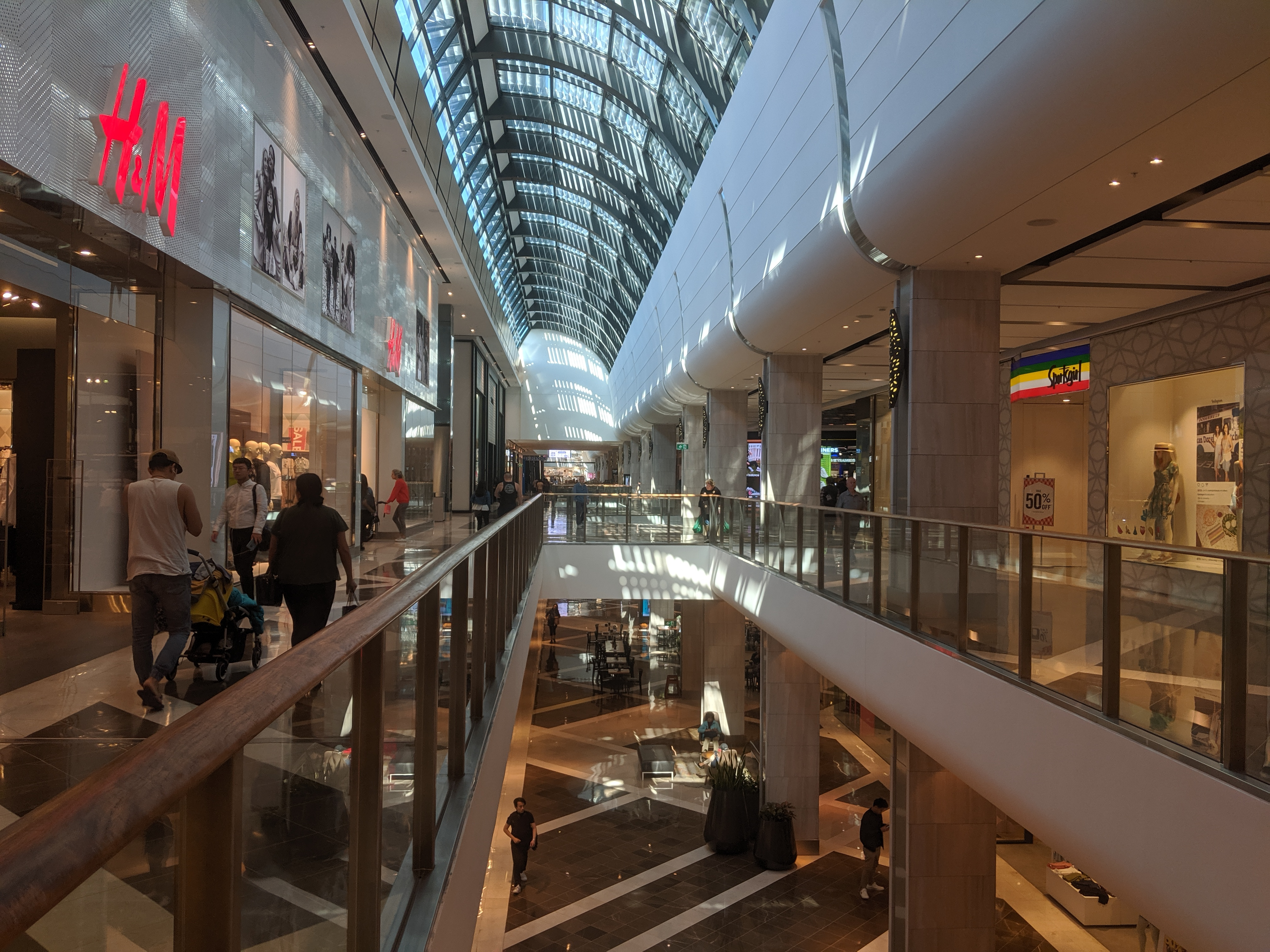
The expansion built in 2014

Macquarie Centre is a shopping centre in the suburb of Macquarie Park in the Northern Sydney region of Sydney and is located opposite the main campus of Macquarie University.

== History ==
=== 20th Century ===
==== 1960s: purchase of land ====
In 1968, Grace Bros purchased 16 acres of land in North Ryde with plans to build a $12 million shopping centre. Rival department store David Jones had shown interest in the area and developed plans with Hooker Investment Corporation to build their own shopping centre known as Garden City on Epping Road, Macquarie Park on what was industrial land. David Jones had difficulty seeking approval, with the plans rejected by Ryde Municipal Council, and they were forced to lodge their plans with the State Planning Authority. Garden City was designed by Donald Crone, one of the leading architects who had designed the Sydney Tower. The plans included 80 speciality stores, an office tower and a distribution centre which would replace the one at Alexandria. The initial development application made by Grace Bros was not approved by council and instead lodged with SPA which was later rejected. Grace Bros, unturned, submitted a further appeal with the support of three town planners.

In 1969, Grace Bros purchased further land and by November 1969, the State Government approved the Grace Bros proposal while David Jones proposal on zoning grounds was rejected.

Throughout the 1970s, Grace Bros barely opened a store with the Macquarie store set to be its first full-line store in over a decade. Work began in March 1979 on the 9.4-hectare (23-acre) site adjoining the university when AMP agreed to become the majority shareholder and provide greater share of the finance for the $80 million shopping centre.

Throughout the construction period, the centre had faced industrial disputes with the Industrial Commission awarding $24 over their awards in November 1979 as major site allowance. After further problems arose, workers were offered $1,000 in shopping vouchers depending on their qualification level. Further disputes continued with the demand for an additional $40 a week increase which was rejected and by July 1981, only a third of the required workforce were on the job.

==== 1980s: opening ====
Macquarie Centre had originally planned to open in Easter 1981, however it was delayed to September and then delayed again to November. The delays had a devastating impact on small retailers who had stocked up for opening deadlines.

Macquarie Centre officially opened on 17 November 1981 by the Premier of New South Wales, Neville Wran. The centre featured an Olympic sized ice rink, Grace Bros (rebranded to Myer in 2004), Big W, Target, Woolworths and 130 speciality stores. Macquarie Centre was the third centre in Sydney to facilitate an "incline mall" design (after Westfield Burwood and Westfield Hurstville) and was built on a spiral staircase around the sundial water fountain. This meant that it is a gently-ascending grade and that the levels were connected via a system of ramps, stairs and escalators.

Franklins Fresh was added to the centre in 1992 and was renamed to Franklins in 2001 and operated until its closure in 2012. The middle of the centre included a spiral atrium with interconnecting stairways called the "Rain Forest". In 1997, this area underwent a refurbishment, redoing the layout entirely and adding a sundial clock fountain, which was removed in 2015.

Macquarie Ice Rink is home to Sydney Bears and Sydney Ice Dogs ice hockey teams. The ice rink is used for ice skating, ice dance, speed skating and ice hockey. Macquarie Centre is the only shopping centre in Sydney to provide a full size Olympic rink (60m x 30m) with seating for approximately 2,000 people. Macquarie Ice Rink was used for the 1991 World short track speed skating Championships.

There were plans for a cinema complex to open in the centre in 1981, however these plans had fallen through. It was not until September 1994 when the eight screen Greater Union multiplex and leisure precinct opened on the rooftop level.

=== 21st Century ===
In 2000, the 'Escape' and 'Loft' areas were opened, which included a major facelift in 1999 to the centre's entrances, extra parking and new retail stores. These included Borders (second store in Australia), BaySwiss, Dick Smith Powerhouse, Freedom and Wheel & Barrow. The Loft was designed as a home wares precinct. This development also included new food outlets and an expansion of the Greater Union cinema complex, from 8 to 16 cinemas. Greater Union was renamed to Event Cinemas in 2009.

In 2010, Fitness First opened on the space vacated by Freedom and JB Hi-Fi moved from the location on level 2 to the space vacated by Borders on level 4.

AMP Wholesale Shopping Centre Fund No. 2 wholly owns the centre after an ownership agreement was reached with former co-owner Westfield in 2012. In October 2021, Cbus and UniSuper each purchased a 25% shareholding.

==== 2010s – 2020s: Recent development ====
In late 2012, AMP Capital Shopping Centres began work on the $440 million redevelopment. Stage 1 of the redevelopment was completed on 17 July 2014 with the opening of Coles, Aldi and the fresh food market. Stage 2 of the redevelopment was completed in October 2014, adding an entire new wing to the existing centre.

Stage 2 consisted of:

- A full line David Jones
- A new 2 level mall linking the new David Jones with the existing centre and Myer
- Approximately 130 new retail stores (including Sydney's first H&M, Zara, Uniqlo and Sephora)
- Additional 1,050 car spaces

As a result, Macquarie Centre is now the largest Sydney suburban shopping centre. It is expected to reach $6 billion in spending by 2021, and can support trade for 337,770 people.

=== Future ===
Plans for the $1 billion redevelopment which included towers have been given approval. The plans would include 1,000 new apartments in four tower blocks, 5,000m² of dedicated community space, including a library and public creative hub. The towers will range in height from 26 to 33 storeys, and adding another 2,175 car parking spaces. A new station plaza between Macquarie University station and the centre is also part of the plan. The development will unfold in stages over several years and future applications will be developed. This mixed use development has been approved on 15 November 2016.

As part of Stage 2 planning being approved, it was announced on 16 January 2019 that Macquarie Ice Rink would close on 31 January 2020 for demolition to make way for the new retail and residential towers.

In February 2019, AMP Capital Shopping Centres announced it had decided to preserve the ice rink. This was largely due to the large public outcry regarding the removal of the iconic rink.

In November 2026, after entering administration David Jones announced that it would close its store in the centre by the end of 2026.

== Tenants ==
Macquarie Centre has 134,900m² of floor space. The major retailers include David Jones, Myer, Big W, Kmart, Aldi, Coles, Woolworths, Cotton On, H&M, Uniqlo, Zara, JB Hi-Fi, Rebel, Fitness First, Timezone, Strike Bowling Bar, Macquarie Ice Rink and Event Cinemas.

== Transport ==
Macquarie University station is adjacent to Macquarie Centre with Metro North West & Bankstown Line trains running from Tallawong to Sydenham.

Macquarie Centre has bus connections to the Sydney CBD, North Shore, Northern Sydney and Greater Western Sydney, as well as local surrounding suburbs. It is served by State Transit Authority of NSW, CDC NSW and Transit Systems. The majority of its bus services are located in Herring Road in front of the shopping centre's main entrance.

Macquarie Centre has multi level car parks with 4,900 spaces.

== Incidents ==
- On 5 June 2007, a 40-year-old woman was stabbed and a man had self-inflicted knife wounds after a domestic incident at the centre carpark. The man was later arrested after he allegedly drove at a police officer and crashed into a parked car as he attempted to leave the scene.
- Between February and June 2017, 16 vehicles, including luxury cars, had an acid-like substance poured on them. The attack was believed to be racially motivated and a man has been charged.
- On 3 July 2017, a police officer was kicked in the face by a group of youths causing him to fall and hit his head. Police were called to the scene after 10pm after a group of youths assaulted two security guards nearby. The 16 year old youth was later charged.
- On 16 April 2018, a 13-year-old boy was bitten in the cheek during an attempted robbery at the centre at around 11:40 am. He was walking with a friend when they were approached by two men, who threatened the boy and tried to steal his sneakers.
- On 17 May 2018, a brawl erupted in the ice rink which involved the chairman of CBR Brave, who started arguing with players from Sydney Bears. The chairman poured beer down on one of the players before a member of the crowd threw a bin at him, sparking an all-in shoving match between the fans.

== In popular culture ==
- The 1984 film Stanley: Every Home Should Have One was partly filmed at Macquarie Centre.
