= GPT Group =

Australian real estate company

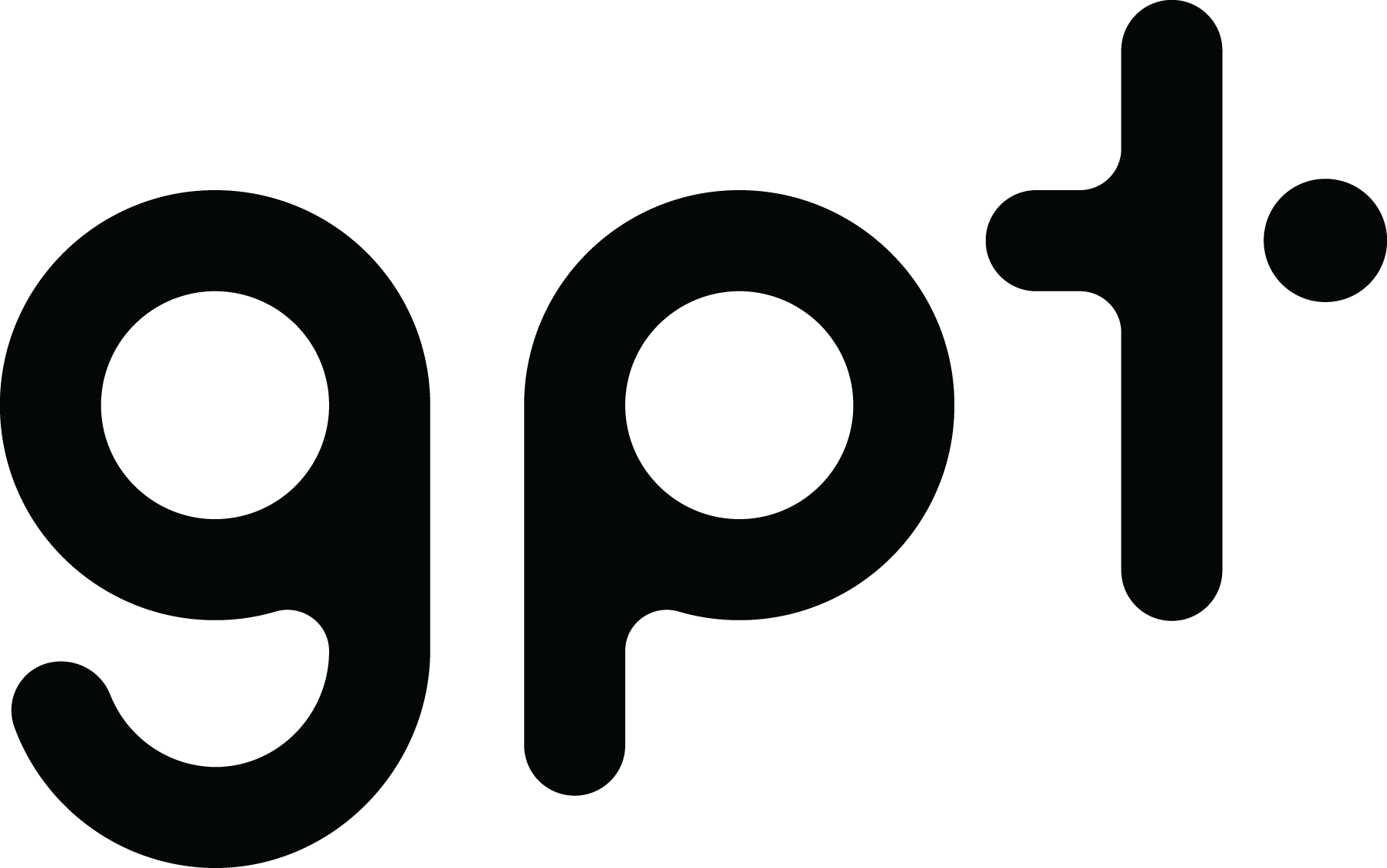
- Formerly: General Property Trust
- Type: Public
- Traded as: ASX: GPT
- Industry: Property trust
- Founded: 1971
- Founder: Lendlease
- Headquarters: Sydney, Australia
- Net income: $862.8 million (2023)
- Divisions: Retail, office, logistics
- Website: www.gpt.com.au

The GPT Group is a real estate investment trust. It has been publicly listed on the Australian Securities Exchange since April 1971, and is one of Australia's largest diversified listed property groups.

== History ==
General Property Trust was managed by Lendlease until it was internalised in 2005 and linking up with Babcock & Brown. It continues to have a few properties managed and co-owned by Lendlease.

GPT focuses on active ownership of Australian real estate in a portfolio valued at more than $20 billion that includes retail, office, logistics, and business park assets. This focus is accompanied by funds management and selective development.

In 2001, GPT purchased the Australian resorts portfolio of P&O.

In February 2021, the company signed an $800 million 50:50 joint venture with an industrial-focused Canadian fund manager, QuadReal Property Group.

In December 2022, the group announced that it had become the retail property manager of shopping centres owned by the ACRT, a venture between AMP, UniSuper, and CBUS.

In September 2025, the group formally opposed OpenAI's application to register ChatGPT as an Australian trademark.

== Accolades ==
GPT is ranked as one of the foremost global performing property and real estate companies in international sustainability benchmarks and awards. GPT has held the number one or two position for the last nine years on the Dow Jones Sustainability Index. In September 2015, GPT confirmed it had achieved a 50% reduction in the emissions intensity of its operations compared to its 2005 baseline.
