= 22 York Street, Sydney =

Heritage-listed building in Sydney, Australia

22 York Street
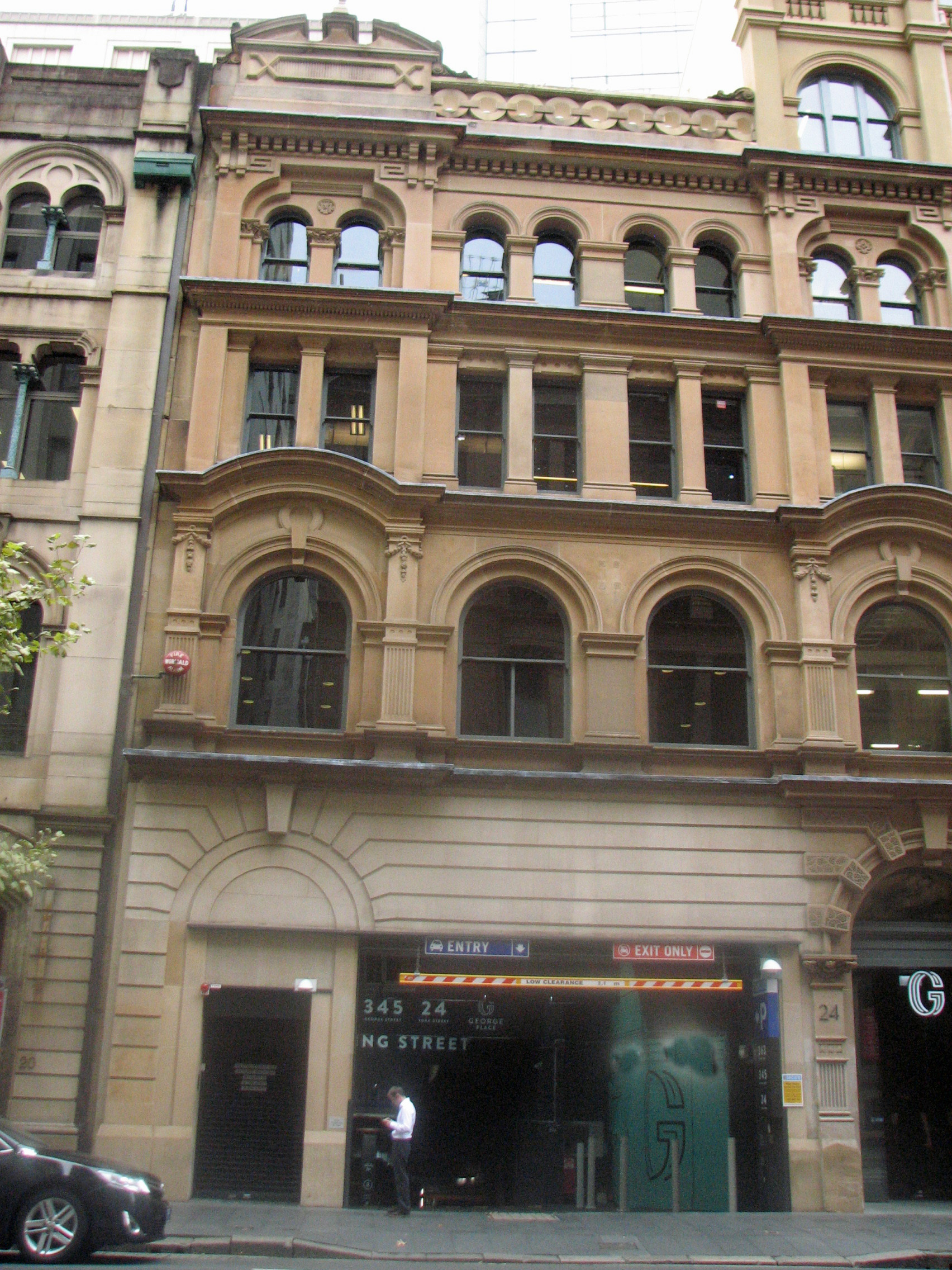
- 22 York Street, Sydney showing the original building as it was before being incorporated with 24–26 York Street

- Location within Sydney Location within Australia
- 33.8682°S 151.2062°E
- Location: 22 York Street, Sydney central business district, City of Sydney, New South Wales, Australia

History
- Built: c. 1878
- Built for: Robert Gray (presumed)

Site notes
- Architectural style: Victorian Romanesque
- Owner: IFM Investors

New South Wales Heritage Register
- Official name: Warehouse (former); Building; Part of The Landmark Building Development
- Type: State heritage (built)
- Designated: 2 April 1999
- Reference no.: 647
- Type: Warehouse/storage area
- Category: Commercial

22 York Street, Sydney is a heritage-listed commercial office and former warehouse located at 22 York Street, in the Sydney central business district, in the City of Sydney local government area of New South Wales, Australia. It has now been incorporated into the Landmark Building development. It was added to the New South Wales State Heritage Register on 2 April 1999. The property was acquired by the Industry Superannuation Property Trust (ISPT) in September 2006.

== History ==
The land on which these buildings stand was granted to Thomas Wright in 1832. In 1873 the land was transferred to James Norton and others, who arranged as trustees for sale to have the property transferred to Robert Gray, warehouseman. Physical evidence supports the presumption that the building was constructed in 1878, the date shown on the parapet. Early photographs show 24–26 in its original four storey configuration; a later photograph shows the name Sargood on the side wall of the six storey building. This extension must have occurred prior to 1913 when Joseland & Vernon submitted a proposal to connect 24–26 to Beard Watsons at 361 George Street; physical evidence suggests a date of about 1905. The 1913 proposal also included the construction of the present cartway and basement area. Beard Watsons continued to occupy the property until at least 1955.

== Description ==
The building at 22–26 York Street, originally four storeys high throughout, now comprises two separate buildings of four storeys (No. 22) and six storeys with basement (Nos. 24–26), all in the Victorian Romanesque style. The building has a structure comprising load bearing masonry envelope and cast iron internal columns with decorative capitals and timber beams. The openings at ground first, third and fourth floor levels are arched.

The original facades of stone, are richly decorated with deep pilasters, and string courses at each floor level, with the extension to Nos. 24–26 rendered (although it is possible that the original stone parapet was reused at the higher level, as it matches that of No 22). The facade of Nos. 24–26 and the modernised ground floor facade of No. 22 (which serves as a vehicular entrance to the Landmark building) are painted. The original facades have florid detailing including rusticated and fluted pilasters with ornate capitals, vermiculated courses, swag mouldings, dentils, parapet and broken pediments topped by urns.

The ground floor to Nos. 24–26, although altered, remains largely in its original configuration. Internally, the building has cast iron columns and timber beams and floors, oversheeted in No. 22 but generally exposed in Nos. 24–26 which also has a top storey lit by large south-light roof windows. Nos. 22–26 is connected at basement and upper levels to buildings at 359–363 George Street, with a lightwell to the upper storeys.

=== Condition ===
As at 19 June 2006, the ground floor has been completely changed as part of the Landmark project in 1986. No. 22 has air conditioning as part of the Landmark building. At street level, No. 22 incorporates ramp to Landmark building carpark. No. 22, having recently been modernised, is generally in good condition, although most original fabric is concealed by later finishes. Intrusive Elements:22 facade and entry ramp at ground level, concrete link to Landmark Building, fire passages and fire stair enclosures, toilets in rear wings, all war partitions and fitout works.

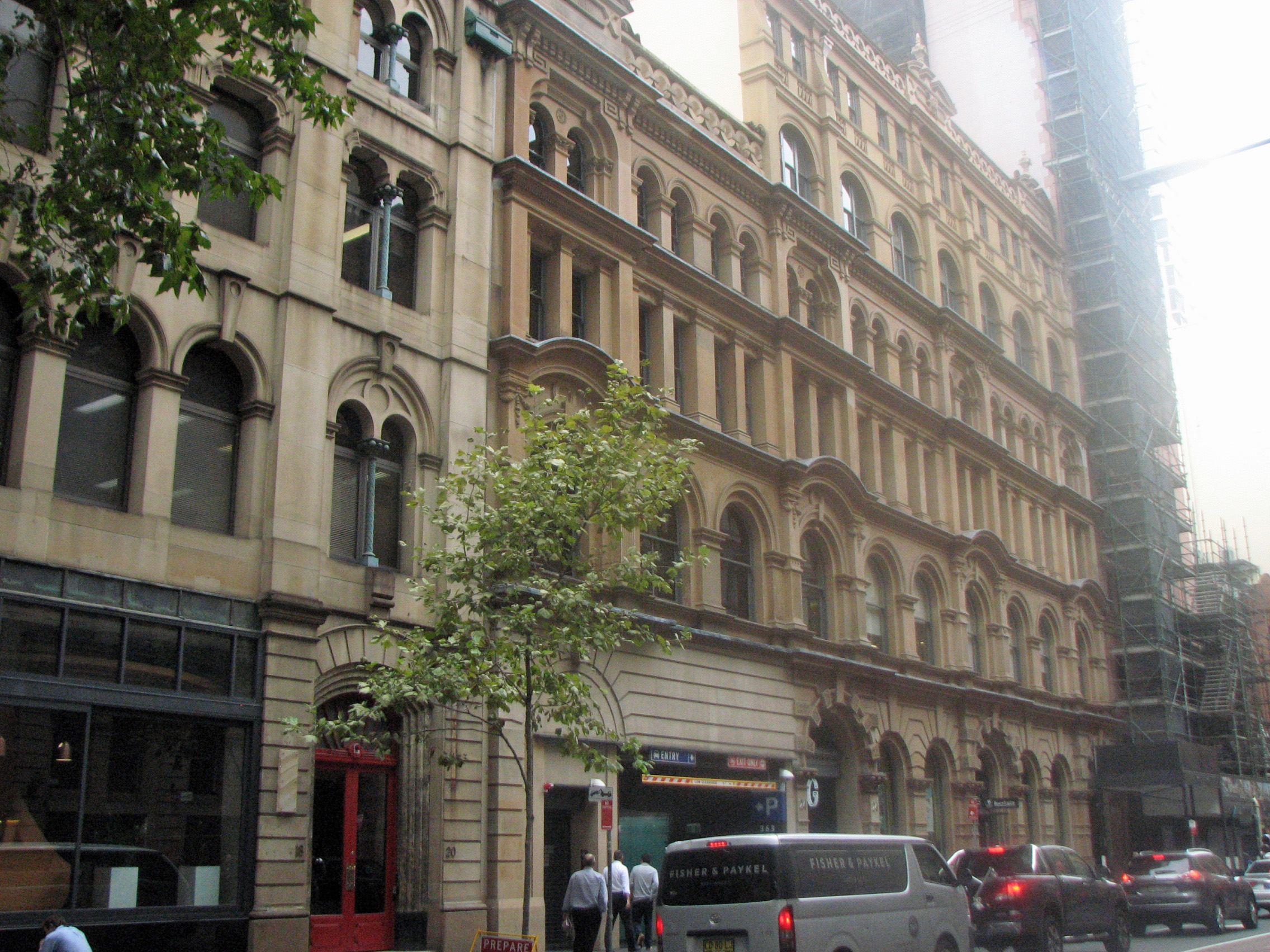
22–26 York Street, with No. 22, four storeys, on the left and No. 24–26, six storeys with basement, on the right

== Heritage listing ==
High Significance: Sandstone facade, timber windows & doors, cast iron columns and timber beams, floors and roof structures, timber ceilings and stairs, basement cartway. Medium Significance:Existing interconnections to 361 George Street. East windows to light well. Water tower. Wncased steel columns to basement. Low Significance:Reinforced concrete fire stairs, recent internal stairs and partitioning, infill of light well. Reglazing of shop windows and central entry door.

22 York Street, Sydney was listed on the New South Wales State Heritage Register on 2 April 1999.

Nos. 24–26 is a Victorian warehouse which retains many original structural elements and finishes. It was for many years associated with the furniture emporium of Beard Watson & Co. It contributes to the character of the Victorian street. The intactness of Nos. 24–26 provides research potential into the construction and use of late 19th-century and early 20th-century warehouses. Nos. 22–26 has a well-detailed and strongly modelled sandstone facade which is almost entirely intact, with alterations comprising an adaptation at street level (No. 22) and a well-detailed Edwardian addition (Nos. 24–26). It forms part of a streetscape between King and Barrack Streets which retains many other 19th- and early 20th-century buildings. It is one of only six former warehouses with surviving cast-iron column structures, and one of very few Victorian commercial buildings which retain their original facade at street level.

== See also ==
- Australian non-residential architectural styles
