= FHSS (disambiguation) =

Frequency-hopping spread spectrum (FHSS) a method of transmitting radio signals by rapidly switching.

FHSS may also refer to:

- Fuhua Secondary School, a secondary school in Jurong West, Singapore
- The First Home Super Saving Scheme in Australia
