= MTAA Super =

- Type: Non-Profit
- Industry: Industry superannuation
- Products: Superannuation
- Website: www.mtaasuper.com.au

MTAA Super (Motor Trades Association of Australia Superannuation Fund) is an industry superannuation fund established to serve the motor trades and allied industries.

Created in 1989, it has become one of Australia's largest super funds. As at 2019, MTAA Super has more than $12 billion funds under management and represents more than 200,000 members and more than 50,000 active employers.

MTAA Super is a public offer fund and allows membership to all Australians.

MTAA Super was named SuperRatings seven year platinum performer for 2003-2010. In 2020, the fund was again awarded Platinum Rating by SuperRatings, who named MTAA Super a “best value for money” super fund.

MTAA Super merged with Tasplan on 1st April 2021 and became Spirit Super.

From 1 Nov 2024, CareSuper will merge with Spirit Super (ex MTA Super).

== Read The Signs ==
Read The Signs is a join initiative between Lifeline Australia and MTAA Super. This program is aimed at promoting suicide prevention among MTAA Super members. Launched in September 2004, Read The Signs was a result of the concern at the numbers of suicide deaths in Australia. Statistics indicate that suicides account for 25% of all deaths amongst young male Australians between the ages of 15 and 24.

== Partners ==
MTAA Super partners with two main organisations.

=== V8 Supercar Series ===
The V8 Supercar Series is an international car racing event. The importance of this event in the Australia motoring industry was recognised by MTAA Super.

=== Lifeline Australia ===
Lifeline Australia is a non-profit organisation delivering a range of counselling and support services addressing social issues. In partnership with Lifeline Australia, MTAA Super launched the Read The Signs initiative in 2004.
