= Industry superannuation fund =

Type of retirement fund in Australia

An industry superannuation fund (or, simply, 'industry fund') are Australian superannuation funds that historically were established by Australian trade unions to manage retirement savings for workers in their industry. Funds other than industry funds are referred to as 'retail funds'.

Most, though not all, industry funds are member of the sector peak body Industry Super Australia. Nevertheless, all industry super funds have operation from inception through a not-for-profit, mutual fund structure. All profits from fund operations are retained by the fund membership, a fact prominent in marketing campaigns run by the peak body.

Formerly, specific industry funds could only be joined and contributed to by employees working in the establishing union's corresponding industry. Following reforms, most fund memberships are not restricted in this way, instead being 'public offer funds' regulated by the Australian Prudential Regulation Authority.

For circumstances relating to their establishment; industry fund boardrooms usually include trade union officials, from the union responsible for establishing the fund. For example, Maritime Super's supervisory board includes union officials from the MUA, while Energy Super formerly had board members from the ETU.

Senior managerial roles within Industry Funds are frequently granted to persons after a career in Labor Party politics or in unionism. Examples include: Wayne Swan (Chair of CBUS), Greg Combet (Chair of Industry Super Australia), and Paul Schroder (AustralianSuper). Members of the Liberal Party and aligned conservative political commentators have criticised the relationship.

== History ==
Prior to 1992, superannuation was common among workers; often enforceable through contribution requirements within industrial awards. Due to the variation in award agreements, superannuation requirements were inconsistent across industries.

The Keating Government changed this by legislating a uniform compulsory 'Superannuation Guarantee' system. Part of the reform's purpose was to promote self-funded retirement, reducing the burden on the taxpayer-funded pension scheme. The change came about through a tripartite agreement between the government, employer groups and trade unions. Trade unions agreed to forgo a national 3% pay increase for their members, which would instead be put into the new superannuation system for all employees in Australia. This was matched by employers' contributions which were set to increase over time. Following this, 72% of Australian workers were covered by retirement savings schemes.

Both union and employer organisations were keen to ensure that money invested into superannuation would be protected from high fees and commission products. This led to the establishment of trade union-based industry super funds, in contrast to pre-existing retail funds.

From 1 July 2005, choice of fund rules came into effect, giving most Australian employees the option to choose the fund into which their employers paid their superannuation contributions. In practice, over 75% of workers remained with their employer's default fund, which was usually an industry fund. From this time, industry super funds were also no longer required to be industry-specific, and most became open to membership by a majority of Australian workers. Such open funds are called public offer funds. Since 1 January 2014, all employers must select an approved MySuper account as their default super fund into which they must pay all default super guarantee contributions (minimum employer contributions). However, employees can nominate an alternative investment fund, called a stapled super fund.

The Fair Work Commission determines which superannuation funds are suitable to be industry super funds and adopted by employers as default funds.

ME Bank was established and owned by 26 industry super funds. It was sold to Bank of Queensland in 2021.

== Entities ==
As of 2023, all industry funds operate under the legal structure of being a non-profit mutual fund. Industry funds collectively manage the retirement savings for 13 million accounts.

All industry funds are governed by trustee boards, with board appointments from employers, trade union representatives, and employees from the relevant industry.

Most industry funds are member of the peak body Industry Super Australia. Some not affiliated with the peak body still refer to themselves as 'industry super funds' for historical reasons. Examples of this include UniSuper, Rest Super and Aware Super.

=== ISA affiliated industry funds ===
As of June 2023, the industry funds affiliated with the ISA are:

- AustralianSuper
- Cbus
- HESTA
- Hostplus
- Spirit Super
- CareSuper
- NGS Super
- TWUSUPER
- FIRSTSuper
- legalsuper
- REI Super

=== Other industry funds ===
Other industry super funds (that are not members of ISA) include Aware Super, Rest Super, and UniSuper.

== Retail super funds ==
Funds that were not historically established by a trade union are known as 'Retail super funds'.

Major non-industry super funds include offerings from AMP, Vanguard Group, Commonwealth Bank, National Australia Bank, Suncorp and ING Australia.

== See also ==
- Superannuation in Australia
