= Legalsuper =

Legalsuper is an Australian superannuation fund dedicated to the legal community. It is the only industry superannuation fund for Australia's legal profession. Its MySuper default account is called MySuper Balanced option.

As an industry super fund, legalsuper is managed exclusively for the benefit of its members. The fund pays no commissions to sales agents and there are no dividends paid to shareholders.

The trustee of legalsuper is Legal Super Pty Ltd. A team of staff is located in Victoria, New South Wales, Queensland and Western Australia.

== History ==
Legalsuper commenced in 2005 with the merger of the NSW Law Industry Superannuation Trust (LIST) and the Victorian Legal Industry Superannuation Scheme (LISS), both of which had commenced in 1989. In 2007, the NSW Barristers’ Superannuation Fund merged with legalsuper, bringing funds under management to more than $860 million and membership to more than 36,000. With the 2007 merger, legalsuper covered around 35% of the Australian legal sector. In 2009, two further funds merged into legalsuper – the Blake Dawson Partners Superannuation Fund and the Victorian Barristers Superannuation Fund.
