= TWUSUPER =

- Type: mutual fund
- Industry: Superannuation
- Headquarters: Australia
- Key people: Frank Sandy (CEO); Nicholas Sherry (chairman)
- AUM: $6.5b
- Members: 99,000
- Website: www.twusuper.com.au

TWUSUPER is an Australian industry superannuation fund.

It operates through a not-for-profit, mutual fund structure.

The fund was established for transportation workers. It now operates on an open-access model. As an industry fund, it is associated with its establishing union the Transport Workers Union.

== Governance ==
The fund is run through the trustee TWU Nominees Pty Ltd. The Board of the trustee consists of six directors appointed by the industry trade union, six directors appointed by industry employers, an independent Director and an independent chair.

The current CEO of TWUSUPER is Frank Sandy. The current chair is former ALP MP Nicholas Sherry.

Internal union disputes have arisen at the Transport Workers Union over the fund's governance board seats. An internal union election in 2022 was noted by the Australian as having stemmed in part from board seat allocations.

In 2017 the fund was criticised for paying its chair, David Galbally AM QC, the highest chairperson salary of all industry super funds; despite its relatively low funds under management.

== History ==
In 2021 the fund abandoned a proposed merger with EISS Super.

In 2022 it was announced that the fund would merge with Mine Super.

== See also ==
- Retail superannuation fund
