= Retail superannuation fund =

Type of retirement fund in Australia

In Australia, the term 'Retail superannuation fund' refers to a superannuation provider that is not an Industry superannuation fund, and so weren't established by a trade union as a method of managing worker retirement savings.

There are various providers of retail super funds in Australia. Australia's four major banks, historically provided superannuation as a component of wealth management services. In recent years however, some international players have entered the market including Vanguard.

Retail fund managers have lobbied for legislative changes that reduce a differential treatment between industry funds and retail funds. One reform that has been advocated for is the de-regulation of workplace default funds; such as by removing certain funds from being a default payment option under Australia's award system.

Not being established in the manner of industry funds, the boards of trustees for retail funds typically do not consist of trade union or employer representatives.

== Major retail funds ==
As at July 2018, the major retail super funds were:

- AMP Flexible Super
- Bendigo Smart Start Super (Bendigo Bank)
- Mercer
- ING Direct Living Super (ING Australia). In December 2015, ING had AU$1.6 billion in super funds under management, with 34,000 active superannuation accounts in 2014.
- MLC Masterkey Super (National Australia Bank)
- Colonial First State (Commonwealth Bank)
- OnePath (ANZ Bank)
- Suncorp Everyday Super (Suncorp)
- Vanguard Super (Vanguard Group)

Now defunct funds include:

- BT Super For Life (Westpac) - (Acquired by Mercer)

== History ==
In 2012, the Abbott government committed to opening up the default fund section system suggesting that doing so will generate greater competition.

=== Hayne royal commission ===
Testimony at the Hayne Royal Commission highlighted conflicts of interest where retail super funds are owned by banks; including bank advisors recommending a retail super fund to their customers, even where not in the best interest of the prospective member. Following the Royal Commission, several banks commenced processes to dispose of their wealth management divisions.

== See also ==
- Industry superannuation fund
- Superannuation in Australia
