= Minimum municipal obligation =

In the United States, a minimum municipal obligation (MMO) is the state-mandated smallest amount a municipality must contribute to any pension plan established for its employees.

== Rules ==
The amount is calculated using actuarial science to ensure that municipal pension plans are sufficiently funded.

The municipality, regardless of the amount contributed by it, is also required to keep the pension plan solvent. If the pension funds become insufficient to meet obligations then the municipality must augment the pension funds using money from other sources.

The general funds of the municipality are thus in effect a guarantor and insurance policy against undercontributions by employees or poor performance of pension fund investments.

However, the municipality is responsible for making up any shortfall between the MMO and the sum of contributions the municipality makes for each employee as a percentage of that employee's wages, plus realized earnings on the pension fund investments. This may be done on a schedule.

The minimum municipal obligation is based on the latest actuarial valuation report prepared under the requirements of Chapter 2 of the act (53 P. S. § § 895.201—895.208). When an actuarial valuation report has been prepared but not transmitted to the municipality, the municipality may utilize data extracted from that actuarial valuation report. The extracted data shall be compiled in a written document and certified by the actuary engaged to prepare the actuarial valuation report. If the data contained in the actuarial valuation report subsequently filed with the Commission differ from the extracted data previously certified and used to determine the minimum municipal obligation, the data resulting in the higher minimum municipal obligation will be applied in determining compliance with the actuarial funding standard.

When the minimum municipal obligation is calculated under section 302(c) of the act, the estimated member contributions used in the calculation of the minimum municipal obligation shall be the member contribution rate applied to the payroll used in calculating the normal cost requirements of the pension plan.

The payroll used in determining the minimum municipal obligation of a pension plan under section 302(c) of the act shall be based on the payroll to be reported on the Internal Revenue Service Form W-2 and shall be calculated as the total payroll for active members of the plan as of the date of the determination, plus the payroll for the same active members of the plan projected to the year's end using the payroll rates in effect as of the date of the determination.

The payroll used in determining the minimum municipal obligation of a pension plan under section 303(c) of the act (53 P. S. § 895.303(c)) shall be based on the payroll to be reported on the Internal Revenue Service Form W-2 and shall be the estimated payroll for the active membership of the pension plan, including projected increases in active membership, for the following plan year.

The revised calculation of the minimum municipal obligation, as prescribed under sections 302 and 303 shall be implemented for the minimum municipal obligations developed for the plan years commencing after December 31, 1991.

If a municipality fails to adopt a minimum municipal obligation, the minimum municipal obligation shall be calculated using the actual payroll and member contributions for the applicable year and actuarial data extracted from the certified actuarial valuation prepared immediately before the year for which the minimum municipal obligation is to be calculated. The minimum municipal obligation calculated under this subsection shall be used to determine compliance with the actuarial funding standard.
