= Rest Super =

Australian retirement fund organization

- Type: Industry superannuation fund
- Founded: 1988; 38 years ago
- Products: Superannuation
- AUM: $93 billion
- Website: rest.com.au

Rest Super (formally Retail Employees Superannuation Trust) is an Australian industry superannuation fund established in 1988. It is one of Australia's largest superannuation funds by membership, with around 2 million members as at March 2025. Rest currently manages more than $93 billion in funds.

== Governance ==
=== Trustee ===
Rest Super is run by a trustee company, Retail Employees Superannuation Pty Ltd, with a board of eight directors. Four directors are nominated on behalf of employees by the Shop, Distributive and Allied Employees Association and four nominated on behalf of employers and employer associations.

=== Fund Administrator ===
The fund administrator of Rest is currently Australian Administration Services (AAS), a superannuation administration company based in Parramatta. AAS is part of MUFG Pension & Market Services A member of MUFG, a global financial group . REST has worked with AAS since 1992, providing full administrative and call-centre services.
