= UniSuper =

Australian superannuation and pension fund

- Company type: Mutual fund
- Industry: Industry superannuation
- Predecessors: Superannuation Scheme for Australian Universities (SSAU); Tertiary Education Superannuation Scheme (TESS)
- Founded: October 2000
- Headquarters: Level 1, 385 Bourke Street, Melbourne, Victoria, Australia
- Key people: Peter Chun, CEO; Greg Armour, Chairman
- AUM: ▲ A$158 billion (funds under management)
- Members: 647,000
- Website: unisuper.com.au

UniSuper is an Australian superannuation fund that provides superannuation services to employees of Australia's higher education and research sector. The fund has over 615,000 members and A$124 billion in funds under management, as of 30 June 2023.

UniSuper is a not-for-profit company whose shareholders are 37 Australian universities and is governed by a corporate Trustee, UniSuper Limited. All the universities have representation on the Consultative Committee.

UniSuper has been granted a MySuper authority, enabling it to continue to receive default superannuation contributions from 1 January 2014.

== Fund history ==
UniSuper was founded on 1 October 2000, as a result of a merger between the Superannuation Scheme for Australian Universities (SSAU) and the Tertiary Education Superannuation Scheme (TESS). Prior to the merger, UniSuper had been the trustee for the SSAU.

UniSuper has pursued a strategy of buying 'fortress' stocks (defensible against disruption), as well as bringing investment functions in-house, in order to achieve significant returns over time.

In May 2024, due to a misconfiguration of a Google Cloud VMware Engine Private Cloud by Google operators as a result of leaving a parameter blank, a previously unknown bug was triggered, resulting in all of UniSuper's data on the platform being deleted. The vast majority of data was later recovered from backup sources, and Google put in place safeguards to ensure a similar incident would not happen again. Google described it as a "one-of-a-kind" event which had never previously occurred within Google Cloud.

== Fund governance ==
UniSuper's day-to-day administration is managed by a wholly owned company, UniSuper Management Pty Ltd (UniSuper Management).

UniSuper's Chief Executive Officer is Peter Chun.

=== Board of directors ===
UniSuper's Board of Directors governs the operations of UniSuper to ensure the Fund is administered in accordance with the Trust Deed, and determines the strategic direction of the Fund. The Board represents, and is accountable to, the members of UniSuper and the Fund's participating employers.

The directors of UniSuper as of 2017 are:

Directors representing employers

- Nominated by shareholder universities
  - Professor Peter Dawkins (Vice-Chancellor and President, Victoria University)
  - Professor Jane den Hollander (Vice Chancellor, Deakin University)
- Nominated by the Consultative Committee employer representatives
  - Nicole Gower
  - Stephen Somogyi

Directors representing members

- Nominated by the Consultative Committee member representatives
  - Professor Lelia Green
  - Keith Tull
- Nominated by national unions
  - Grahame McCulloch - National Tertiary Education Union
  - Sarah Roberts - National Tertiary Education Union

Independent Directors

- Ian Martin AM (chairman)
- Nicolette Rubinsztein
- Mark Amour

=== Consultative Committee ===
The Consultative Committee reviews and approves changes to the Trust Deed and is responsible for nominating four directors to the board of directors.

Shareholder universities each appoint up to four members to the Consultative Committee. Half the members represent the employers, the other half represents, equally, academic staff and general staff.

As at 24 March 2017, the Consultative Committee had 145 members and there were four vacant positions.

== See also ==
- Superannuation in Australia
- Australian Retirement Trust
- AustralianSuper
- Aware Super
- Hostplus
- Vanguard Super
