= HESTA =

Australian superannuation fund

- Company type: Industry superannuation fund
- Industry: Superannuation
- Founded: 1987; 39 years ago
- Headquarters: Australia
- Area served: Australia
- Key people: Debby Blakey, CEO
- Website: hesta.com.au

HESTA is an Australian industry superannuation fund for workers in health and community service sectors. HESTA services more than 90,000 employers and has more than 1.05 million members, around 80% of whom are women. It has more than $100 billion in funds under management. HESTA was formed in 1987. HESTA holds an Australian financial services licence. It was awarded the SuperRatings Net Benefit Award 2026 — recognising HESTA as the Australian super fund delivering the best net benefit outcomes for members over the short and long term.

== History ==
HESTA removed all tobacco investments from its portfolios in 2013. In 2015, HESTA sold its stake in Transfield Services citing evidence of human rights violations inside the offshore detention centres run by the sharemarket-listed company.

== Governance ==
HESTA is run by a Trustee company called H.E.S.T. Australia Limited. The Board of the trustee consists of six Directors appointed by employees, six Directors appointed by employers, an independent Director and an independent chair. The CEO is Debby Blakey.
