= Hostplus =

Australian superannuation fund

- Industry: Industry superannuation fund
- Founded: 1988; 38 years ago
- Founders: Australian Hotels Association; United Workers Union
- Headquarters: Australia
- Owner: Host Plus Pty Ltd
- Website: hostplus.com.au

Hostplus is an Australian industry superannuation fund. As of 2025, being the third largest superannuation fund in Australia by member accounts and the fifth largest by assets under management, it is 'giant' with around 2.1 million members and over $118b funds under management.

In September 2023, it was announced that Hostplus completed its merger with Maritime Super, the largest industrial fund focused on the maritime industry with more than fifty years of existence.

== History ==
It was founded in the early 1980s as the industry fund for hospitality workers. For this reason, its establishment and management is associated with the United Voice trade union.

In 2022, Statewide Super merged with HostPlus. The following year, the fund announced that it would no longer be offering property / infrastructure stand-alone funds to members.

== Reception ==
The fund has been rated highly by Canstar.
