= Cbus (superannuation fund) =

Superannuation fund for the building and construction industries in Australia

Construction and Building Unions Superannuation (Cbus)
- Type: Mutual fund
- Industry: Industry superannuation
- Headquarters: Wesley Place, Level 22, 130 Lonsdale Street, Melbourne, Victoria, Australia
- Key people: Kristian Fok, CEO; Wayne Swan, Chairman
- Products: Superannuation
- Revenue: A$90+ billion (funds under management)
- Members: 900,000
- Number of employees: 800
- Website: cbussuper.com.au

Construction and Building Unions Superannuation (Cbus) is an Australian industry super fund. It is one of Australia's largest super funds. It is open to all members of the public as a public offer fund. Due to its mutual fund structure, Cbus retains all profits to members.

== History ==
The fund was established in 1984 by the Building Workers' Industrial Union of Australia to provide a retirement savings vehicle for workers in construction and other affiliated industries. 30,000 members signed up in the first six months, employers contributing $9.00 a week to their workers' retirement savings. Mavis Robertson oversaw the creation of the fund.

In August 2024, the Australian Prudential Regulation Authority (APRA) mandated that Cbus commission an independent review into skill sets of directors on the fund's board, following the decision of the federal government to place the majority of the CFMEU into external administration. The independent review found that the fund "lacked proper systems, processes and frameworks for documenting and assessing if spending was in members' best financial interests". It was subsequently reported that Cbus had hosted a 40th anniversary event in July 2024.

In November 2024, the Australian Securities and Investments Commission (ASIC) took Cbus to court for failing to process more than 7,000 death and disability claims in a timely way. Cbus was fined $23.5 million in November 2025. It also paid $32 million in compensation to 7402 people in relation to the case. Cbus settled a dispute with its administrator MUFG to resolve past issues.

== Features ==
There are over 136,000 employers that have made Cbus the default fund for their employees, and the fund manages roughly $85 billion in retirement savings.

== Governance ==
United Super Pty Ltd is the Trustee of Cbus Superannuation Fund. The Directors of United Super Pty Ltd are appointed in equal number from member and employer associations in the construction and building industries. Two independent directors sit on the board.

The current chair of the board is Wayne Swan, former Treasurer of Australia.

The prior chair to Swan was the former Victorian Premier Steve Bracks.
