= Boycott of Russia and Belarus =

Boycotts following the Russian invasion of Ukraine

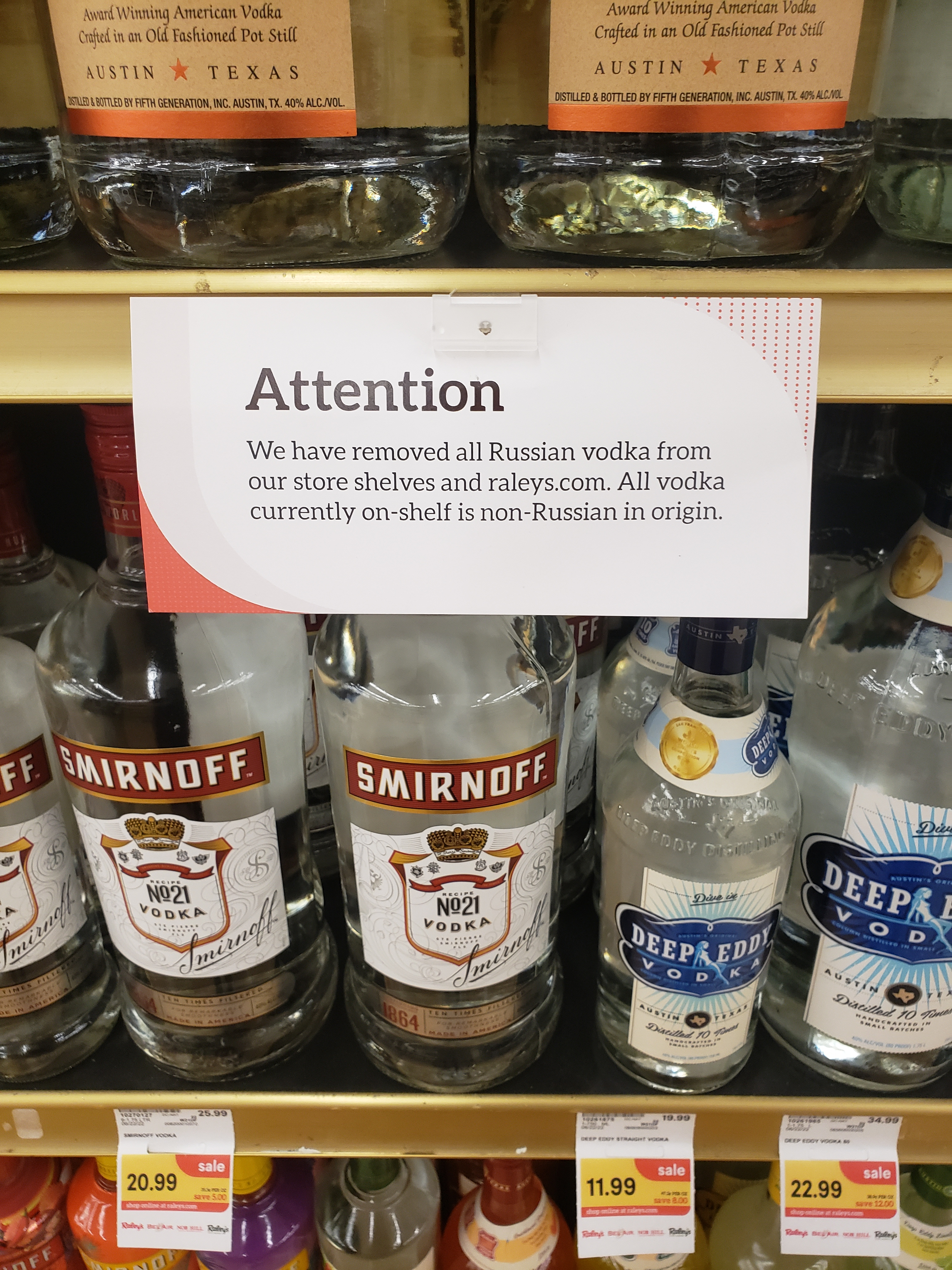
Retailers around the world removed Russian-made products from their inventories due to the invasion, either voluntarily or as a result of sanctions.

Since early 2022, Russia and Belarus have been boycotted by many companies and organizations in Europe, North America, Australasia, and elsewhere, in response to the Russian invasion of Ukraine, which is supported by Belarus. As of 2 July 2022, the Yale School of Management recorded more than 1,000 companies withdrawing or divesting themselves from Russia, either as a result of sanctions or in protest of Russian actions. Ukrainian National Agency on Corruption Prevention maintains a list called International Sponsors of War that includes companies and individuals still doing business with Russia.

== History ==
The majority of countries which sanctioned Russia following its 2014 annexation of Crimea began imposing additional sanctions to punish Russia for invading Ukraine—a move for which Russian President Vladimir Putin had long prepared. Many companies were not impacted by sanctions against Russia but ruled in favour of cutting ties with the country either due to the public pressure or in protest of the Russian government's actions, or both. Ukrainian institutions have stated that the need for these measures is urgent.

The response can be broadly divided into a "cultural boycott", aimed at amplifying the international condemnation of the invasion, and an "economic boycott", which is designed to make the war effort less sustainable. As a result of the latter, several commentators have warned of an unprecedented economic collapse in Russia's future, citing a 30% drop in the ruble's value, a 20% rise in interest rates and a 1% GDP expansion down from 1.7%. Analyses by multiple firms project year end GDP contraction of at least 5% and inflation of 15%. Some of the most critical blows to Russian infrastructure have been the loss of access to the SWIFT payment system and limitations on Russia's ability to export oil. US Senator Bernie Sanders has stated that this crisis should influence energy policy more broadly in order to deter "authoritarian petrostates". While Shell plc has been noted for relinquishing its stake in Gazprom, it was also criticised for buying a cargo of discounted Russian crude oil. The next day, following public outcry, Shell defended the purchase as a short term necessity, but also announced that it intends to reduce such purchases and put the profits from them into a fund that will go towards humanitarian aid to Ukraine. As of 10 March, half of the ten largest international companies with business ties to Russia announced that they are withdrawing or closing their operations; and the number of companies that have done so is over 300.

Some of the largest snack and fast food companies have faced criticism for continuing to do business in Russia and Belarus. Anthony Pompliano has defended cryptocurrency trading platforms for not participating in the boycott, stating "there is an incredible amount of inhumanity that goes into the decision to cut off the average citizen from the global financial system. What was their crime?" Critics of the Israeli government have pointed out that several American politicians who support isolating Russia economically previously campaigned for and passed anti-BDS laws punishing boycotts of Israel.

The cultural side of the boycott has focused on reducing the number of entertainment products available to people in Russia. These include films and albums but also live televised events that are hosted in Western countries. Yasmeen Serhan has commented that nationalistic sentiment, which has historically benefited Putin's regime, will be undermined by Russia's exclusion from sporting events. The banning of Russia and Belarus from the Olympics has drawn comparisons to the athletic boycott of apartheid South Africa. According to Olympic historians David Wallechinsky and Bill Mallon, the decision can be considered a turning point when compared to past leniency over the state-sponsored doping programme in Russia or the attempted abduction of Krystsina Tsimanouskaya by Belarus.

In addition to cancelling planned appearances in Russia, several entertainment organisations with Russian members began to scrutinise their past support for Putin. Some of these celebrities refused to condemn the war but others lost their contracts because they did so without mentioning Putin by name. A statement by Alex Ovechkin, for example, called for peace in general and mentioned that his family members in Russia were also in danger. However, Czech former Detroit Red Wings and Ottawa Senators goaltender Dominik Hašek responded to Ovechkin and criticized him for his past support of Putin, stating "What!? Not only an alibist, a chicken shit, but also a liar!", while also calling on the NHL to suspend all Russian players. One musician who referred to his family's safety when condemning the war was Alexander Malofeev. The Vancouver Recital Society, which had begun requiring this of all Russian performers, responded that Malofeev's statement was not sufficient to allow his concert to go ahead.

Despite ongoing sanctions, 47 of the world's biggest 200 companies still have not left Russia, particularly energy companies remain invested there. U.K. energy giant Shell and Japanese trading firms Mitsui and Mitsubishi hold double-digit stakes in the Sakhalin-2 oil and natural gas project. On July 1, 2022, Putin signed a decree to allow the government to seize the Sakhalin-2 oil and natural gas project but further attempts to formally nationalize the assets of international firms were paused when the bill did not make it through the State Duma before the 2022 summer recess. According to Western analysts, remaining companies have experienced expropriation and nationalization pressures, but officially Russia has denied that it is interested in such actions. In August 2022, Russia's trade and industry minister Denis Manturov stated, "we are not interested in the nationalization of enterprises or their removal.”

== Boycotting companies and organisations ==
=== Banking and finance ===
Company or organisation	Industry	Country	Actions	Date	Ref.
Abrdn	Financial services	United Kingdom	Abrdn announced it will reduce its holdings in Russia and Belarus.	1 March 2022	
Alaska Permanent Fund	Sovereign wealth fund	United States	After pressure from Alaskan legislators, the Alaska Permanent Fund announced it will not purchase any new Russian securities and will look to divest its Russian portfolio, consisting of US$63m in fixed income, US$153m in public equities and US$2.7m in private equity.	10 March 2022	
American Express	Payment systems	United States	American Express announced it had suspended all operations in Russia. All American Express cards will not work at merchants or ATMs in Russia and cards issued by Russian institutions will not work outside of the country. American Express stated its business in Russia is "small".	6 March 2022	
Apple Pay	Online payment systems	United States	Apple Pay stopped working in Russia due to sanctions on Russian banks. In 2020, 20% of Russians were using Apple Pay.	26 February 2022	
Asian Infrastructure Investment Bank	Banking	Asia	The Asian Infrastructure Investment Bank (AIIB) stated it had put all activities relating to Russia and Belarus "on hold and under review."	3 March 2022	
Australian Future Fund and NSW Generations Fund	Sovereign wealth fund	Australia	Australia's Future Fund announced it would dump all Russian assets, worth A$200m, while the New South Wales government would dump A$75m of Russian assets from its NSW Generations Fund.	28 February 2022	
Australian Retirement Trust	Superannuation	Australia	The Australian Retirement Trust announced it would dump A$133m in Russian assets.	3 March 2022	
AustralianSuper	Superannuation	Australia	AustralianSuper announced it would dump its A$175m portfolio of Russian assets as quickly as possible.	4 March 2022	
Aware Super	Superannuation	Australia	Aware Super announced it would dump its A$50m Russian investment portfolio.	1 March 2022	
Cbus	Superannuation	Australia	Cbus pledged to divest from Russian assets as soon as possible.	1 March 2022	
Coinbase	Cryptocurrency	United States	Coinbase blocked 25,000 wallets belonging to sanctioned individuals. It also stated the use of "sophisticated blockchain analytics" to identify accounts indirectly linked to banned users.	7 March 2022	
Colonial First State	Superannuation	Australia	Colonial First State announced it would divest its Russian exposure, which made up 0.1% of its total funds.	3 March 2022	
Goldman Sachs Group Inc	Financial services	United States	Goldman Sachs Group Inc is winding down its business in Russia in compliance with regulatory and licensing requirements.	10 March 2022	
Google Pay	Online payment systems	United States	Google Pay stopped working in Russia due to sanctions on Russian banks. In 2020, 29% of Russians were using Google Pay.	26 February 2022	
Government Employees Superannuation Board	Superannuation	Australia	Western Australia's Government Employees Superannuation Board (GESB) stated it would reduce its exposure to 20 Russian companies, including Gazprom, Rosneft, Sberbank and Lukoil.	3 March 2022	
Government Pension Fund of Norway	Sovereign wealth fund	Norway	The Government Pension Fund of Norway announced it will divest its Russian assets from 47 companies, including Sberbank, Gazprom and Lukoil, worth 25 billion crowns in 2021. However, it later stated its value is likely worth only 2.5 billion crowns and they were "pretty much written off".	27 February 2022	
Gunvor	Commodities trading	Switzerland	Gunvor announced it had already sold all of its Russian assets but would review its minority, non-controlling stake in Ust-Luga Oil Products terminal.	4 March 2022	
HESTA	Superannuation	Australia	HESTA announced it had sold Russian assets from its Sustainable Growth super fund and it does not intend to reinvest in Russian sovereign bonds and other Russian assets in the future.	February 2022	
Hostplus	Superannuation	Australia	Hostplus confirmed it would offload its A$10m in Russian assets.	4 March 2022	
JCB Co., Ltd.	Payment systems	Japan	JCB announced the suspension of all its services in Russia.	8 March 2022	
JPMorgan Chase	Financial services	United States	JPMorgan Chase announced it was actively unwinding business and would not pursue any new business in Russia. JPMorgan had fewer than 200 employees located in Russia.	10 March 2022	
Legal & General	Financial services	United Kingdom	Legal & General announced it will reduce its holdings in Russian assets, stating that 0.1% of its assets under management were Russian.	1 March 2022	
Mastercard	Payment systems	United States	Mastercard blocks transactions linked to multiple Russian institutions on 1 March. It further announced on 5 March that all cards issued by Russian banks will not work anywhere inside or outside of Russia, at Russian merchants and ATMs. Russia made up about 4% of Mastercard's net revenue for 2021.	1 March 2022	
National Employment Savings Trust	Government pension scheme	United Kingdom	The National Employment Savings Trust told its fund managers to sell all existing Russian shares and government bonds as soon as possible and pledged not to buy any more.	1 March 2022	
New York State Department of Financial Services	Government regulatory body	United States	New York Governor Kathy Hochul signed an executive order on 27 February, directing all New York State agencies and authorities to review and divest public funds from Russia. On 2 March, the state's Department of Financial Services expedited the procurement of blockchain analytics technology, allowing it to detect exposure of virtual currency businesses to sanctioned individuals.	27 February 2022	
PayPal	Online payment systems	United States	PayPal stopped accepting new users from signing up to PayPal in Russia and blocked transactions by some users and banks in Russia as of 2 March. On 5 March, it shut down its services in Russia.	2 March 2022	
Paysera LT	Payment systems	Lithuania	Paysera announced it will no longer accept transactions in rubles, close Russian accounts, and restrict money transfers to and from Russian banks.	24 February 2022	
Remitly	Payment systems	United States	Remitly suspended all money transfers to Russia in February 2022.	28 February 2022	
Revolut	Financial services	United Kingdom	Revolut blocked payments to Russia and Belarus, and halted its support for transfers to or from parties in Belarus.	4 March 2022	
Trafigura	Commodities trading	Singapore	Trafigura froze all Russian investments, including its share in Rosneft led project Vostok Oil.	2 March 2022	
Visa	Payment systems	United States	Visa announced they have suspended all operations in Russia, including disabling all cards issued by Russian banks from being used outside of Russia, and all cards issued outside of Russia from being used within Russia. Russia made up about 4% of Visa's net revenue for 2021.	3 March 2022	
Western Union	Financial services	United States	Western Union stated it will suspend operations in Russia and Belarus.	10 March 2022	
Wise	Payment systems	United Kingdom	Wise suspended all money transfers to Russia after limiting daily transfers to £200. However, their website still provides a rouble exchange rate estimate for reference.	28 February 2022	
World Bank	Banking	International	The World Bank announced it had stopped all programs in Russia and Belarus. It also stated it had not approved any new loans or investments to Russia since 2014 and Belarus since mid-2020.	2 March 2022	

==== Other ====
- The Church of England announced on 25 February it will sell £20 millions in Russian holdings held by its Church Commissioners and the Church of England Pensions Board. The church also said it would not make any further investments in Russia, calling it an "immoral flood of corrupt money".

=== Education, research and science ===
Company or organisation	Industry	Country	Actions	Date	Ref.
Agence nationale de la recherche	Government agency	France	The French National Research Agency suspended its partnership with the Russian Science Foundation and announced it will no longer take part in actions or funding involving Russian or Belarusian institutions.	3 March 2022	
All European Academies	Non-government organisation	Europe	The All European Academies suspended the membership of the Russian Academy of Sciences and the National Academy of Sciences of Belarus.	4 March 2022	
Arctic Council	Intergovernmental organisation	International	All countries, except Russia, announced they will temporarily pause their participation in the Arctic Council since Russia holds the chairmanship.	3 March 2022	
Arizona State University	University	United States	Arizona State University divested its US$2.3m in Russian assets.	7 March 2022	
Australian National University	University	Australia	The Australian National University (ANU) suspended all links with the Moscow State Institute of International Relations and the National Research University Higher School of Economics.	3 March 2022	
CERN	Non-government organisation	Switzerland	CERN announced it had suspended Russia's status as an observer to the organisation, would prohibit Russia from attending open sessions of the CERN Council, and would revoke its "special right" to attend restricted sessions on the Large Hadron Collider. There will also be no new collaborations with Russian institutions, however the 1100 current academics and institutes will be able to continue their work.	8 March 2022	
Clarivate and Web of Science	Analytics	United States	Analytics company Clarivate closed its Russian office and ceased all commercial activity in the country. It also suspended the evaluation of all new journal submissions from Russia and Belarus in the Web of Science.	11 March 2022	
Council on International Educational Exchange	Non-government organisation	United States	The Council on International Educational Exchange suspended its spring 2022 program in Saint Petersburg, relocating students to other universities in Eastern Europe.	28 February 2022	
Deakin University	University	Australia	Deakin University announced that it would not enter any new agreements with Russia, not accept any new Russian students and exit its small indirect holding in Russian funds. It also stated that it does not currently have any partnerships with Russian agencies or universities.	8 March 2022	
Department for Business, Energy and Industrial Strategy and UK Research and Innovation	Government agency	United Kingdom	UK's science minister George Freeman announced a review of all research funding from the UK government to Russian beneficiaries on 27 February 2022. This led to the UK Research and Innovation agency to suspend 50 grants for projects at British universities that were linked to Russian universities.	27 February 2022	
Durham University	University	United Kingdom	Durham University suspended all bilateral research collaboration with institutions in Russia and Belarus.	10 March 2022	
edX	Online education	United States	edX announced that all courses offered by Russian universities – ITMO University, National Research Nuclear University MEPhI, National University of Science and Technology MISiS, Peoples' Friendship University of Russia and Ural Federal University were removed from its website.	4 March 2022	
European Commission	Government agency	Europe	The European Commission suspended all payments to Russian institutions involved in EU-funded research projects. It also suspended the preparation of grant agreements for four projects under Horizon Europe.	2 March 2022	
European Girls' Mathematical Olympiad	Mathematics competition	Europe	The European Girls' Mathematical Olympiad excluded Russia from the competition in 2022, allowing Russia to compete in the competition remotely as private individuals.	15 March 2022	
European Space Agency	Government agency	Europe	The European Space Agency delayed ExoMars, a joint Europe-Russian mission to send a rover to Mars. Russia was set to provide the Kazachok lander and the mission was intended to launch on a Russian Proton rocket.	28 February 2022	
European University Association	Non-government organisation	Europe	The European University Association suspended the membership of 12 Russian universities who signed a pro-war statement.	7 March 2022	
European XFEL	Research facility	Germany	The European X-Ray Free-Electron Laser Facility announced it will not start new agreements with Russian institutions and will suspend existing ones.	2 March 2022	
French National Centre for Scientific Research	Government agency	France	The French National Centre for Scientific Research suspends all new scientific collaboration with Russia.	2 March 2022	
German Academic Exchange Service	Non-government organisation	Germany	The German Academic Exchange Service restricts all exchange to Russia, including cancelling scholarships for those offered to study in Russia.	25 February 2022	
German Research Foundation	Government agency	Germany	The German Research Foundation suspended all scientific collaboration with Russia, including the sharing of data, samples, research and equipment. Researchers applying for a fellowship in Russia will have to choose another country.	2 March 2022	
Global Network for Advanced Management	Non-government organisation	International	The Global Network for Advanced Management suspends the Moscow School of Management SKOLKOVO from its network upon request from the school's dean.	8 March 2022	
International Mathematical Olympiad	Mathematics competition	International	The International Mathematical Olympiad suspended the membership of Russia, allowing Russia to compete in the competition remotely as private individuals.	25 March 2022	
International Mathematical Union	Non-government organisation	International	The International Mathematical Union moved the 2022 International Congress of Mathematicians and awarding of the Fields Medal online; it was originally scheduled to be held in Saint Petersburg.	26 February 2022	
Journal of Molecular Structure	Academic journal	None	The Journal of Molecular Structure stopped considering manuscripts submitted by scientists at Russian institutions.		
Julius Maximilian University of Würzburg	University	Germany	The Julius Maximilian University of Würzburg halts all institutional collaborations with Russia and bans researchers from undertaking business trips in Russia.	8 March 2022	
Massachusetts Institute of Technology	University	United States	Massachusetts Institute of Technology (MIT) ended its relationship with the Skolkovo Foundation, affecting 21 MIT faculty members and 38 students.	25 February 2022	
Max Planck Institute for Extraterrestrial Physics	Non-government organisation	Germany	The Max Planck Institute for Extraterrestrial Physics switched off the eROSITA black hole telescope aboard the Russian Spektr-RG satellite.	26 February 2022	
Middlebury College	University	United States	Middlebury College suspended its Russian exchange programme, allowing students to complete the course remotely.	28 February 2022	
NASA	Government agency	United States	Space agency NASA explored ways to keep the International Space Station in orbit without Russia. It noted that Northrop Grumman had offered reboost capability and suggested that SpaceX could help.	1 March 2022	
National Research Council	Government agency	Italy	Italy's National Research Council announced it will suspend operations in Russia and will not renew research agreements with institutions linked to Russia.	28 February 2022	
QS World University Rankings	Non-government organisation	United Kingdom	The QS World University Rankings announced it will remove Russian and Belarusian universities from future rankings and will cease promoting study at its universities.	7 March 2022	
Royal Netherlands Academy of Arts and Sciences and the Dutch Research Council	Non-government organisation	Netherlands	All universities, university medical centres, universities of applied sciences, the Royal Netherlands Academy of Arts and Sciences and the Dutch Research Council suspended partnerships with institutions in Russia and Belarus.	4 March 2022	
Stanford University	University	United States	Stanford University ends a US$1.65m contract with an undisclosed entity from Russia.	12 March 2022	
Tallinn University of Technology	University	Estonia	TalTech stops accepting new Russian, Belarusian students.	23 March 2022	
UAM	University	Poland	The Adam Mickiewicz University suspends all collaboration with Russian and Belarusian universities.	3 March 2022	
Universities UK	Non-government organisation	United Kingdom	Universities UK suspended its memorandum of understanding with the Russian Union of Rectors after it publishes a pro-war statement.	7 March 2022	
University of Aberdeen	University	United Kingdom	The University of Aberdeen suspended all bilateral agreements with Russian institutions indefinitely.	1 March 2022	
University of Arizona	University	United States	The University of Arizona divested its US$1.5m in Russian assets.	7 March 2022	
University of Colorado	University	United States	The University of Colorado announced it would liquidate its investment in publicly traded Russian companies and mutual funds with holdings in Russia, around US$6.1m.	3 March 2022	
University of Glasgow	University	United Kingdom	The University of Glasgow announced it would suspend all partnerships with Russian and Belarusian academic institutions throughout the university.	9 March 2022	
University of Reading	University	United Kingdom	The University of Reading suspends its partnership with the Moscow State Institute of International Relations.	11 March 2022	
University of St Andrews	University	United Kingdom	The University of St Andrews announced it suspended all programs, collaborations and activities with Russia, including its joint Masters program with Moscow State University. It also divested its £40,000 in Russian holdings.	8 March 2022	
University of Tartu	University	Estonia	The University of Tartu restricts applications from Russian and Belarusian students.	9 March 2022	
University of Tübingen	University	Germany	The University of Tübingen suspends all cooperation with Russian universities and research facilities, joint research activities and joint conferences. It also cancelled student exchanges in Russia and business trips to Russia.	3 March 2022	
Western Sydney University	University	Australia	Western Sydney University suspended all ties and activities with Russian universities and institutions.	7 March 2022	

=== Energy ===
Company or organisation	Industry	Country	Actions	Date	Ref.
Amber Grid	Natural gas	Lithuania	Lithuania became the first EU country to end imports of Russian gas following the Russian invasion of Ukraine.	1 April 2022	
BP	Oil and gas	United Kingdom	BP announced it had exited its 19.75% shareholding in Rosneft, worth approximately US$14 billion. Furthermore, BP announces the resignation of its staff from the Rosneft board of directors, BP Chief Executive Bernard Looney and former BP chief executive Robert Dudley.	27 February 2022	
Centrica	Energy	United Kingdom	Centrica announced it would exit all gas supply agreements with Russian companies, principally with Gazprom.	1 March 2022	
ExxonMobil	Oil and gas	United States	ExxonMobil cut ties with Russia, discontinuing operations and exiting the Sakhalin-II oil project. It also announced it will not be investing in new developments in the country.	2 March 2022	
Eneos	Oil and gas	Japan	Eneos pledged to end crude oil imports from Russia after its contract ends in April. It seeks alternative sources from the Middle East.	22 March 2022	
Equinor	Energy	Norway	Equinor announced its decision to stop new investments into Russia, and start the process of exiting Equinor's Russian Joint Ventures, worth US$1.2 billion.	28 February 2022	
Fortum	Energy	Finland	Fortum announced it will not make new investments in Russia and will reduce its exposure to thermal power production. Fortum owns seven thermal power plants in Russia and has a 78% stake in Uniper which owns five thermal power plants.	3 March 2022	
Idemitsu Kosan	Oil and gas	Japan	Idemitsu Kosan suspended all crude oil imports from Russia following the announcement of Eneos.	23 March 2022	
Rosneft	Oil and gas	Germany	Due to a boycott of Russian crude, three Rosneft refineries were taken over by the German state to avert a shut-down.	18 Sept 2022	
Shell	Oil and gas	United Kingdom	Shell stopped buying Russian crude oil and stated it would phase out its involvement in all Russian hydrocarbons from oil to natural gas. It apologised for buying Russian oil after it had said it would pull out of its Russian operations. It had previously announced a withdrawal from all Russian exposure on 1 March, including pulling out of the Sakhalin-II LNG project, and withdrawing its support of the Nord Stream 2 pipeline project.	1 March 2022	
TotalEnergies	Oil and gas	France	TotalEnergies announced it "will no longer provide capital for new projects in Russia" but has retained ownership of its 19.4% stake in privately owned Novatek, 20% stake in the Yamal project and 10% stake in Arctic LNG 2.	1 March 2022	
Uniper	Energy	Germany	Uniper announced it would take a full impairment loss on its loan to Nord Stream 2 worth €987m and would divest from its majority 83.73% stake in Unipro. However, it would not end long-term gas supply contracts as they are vital to Europe's gas supply.	7 March 2022	
Vestas	Wind	Denmark	Vestas announced it had stopped four wind turbine projects in Russia which were expected to be operational in late 2022 with capacity 253MW. It further announced it will not enter into new Russian projects.	3 March 2022	

=== Entertainment ===
Company or organisation	Industry	Country	Actions	Date	Ref.
The Walt Disney Company	Motion pictures Content and product licensing	United States	Disney first announced that it would pause theatrical releases in Russia, including the release of Turning Red on 1 March, The company ended all business in Russia, including content and product licensing, Disney Cruise Line activities, National Geographic magazine, tours and content production on 10 March.	1 March 2022 (Motion pictures); 10 March 2022 (Other activities)	
Sony Pictures Entertainment	Motion pictures	United States	Sony Pictures Entertainment first suspended theatrical releases in the country, beginning with Morbius on 1 March, Two weeks later on 11 March, the company halted business operations in Russia, leading to cancellations of future television distribution deals and a planned home entertainment release of Spider-Man: No Way Home. Crunchyroll also suspended its anime streaming service in Russia.	1 March 2022 (Motion pictures); 11 March 2022 (TV distribution deals, home entertainment releases and Crunchyroll)	
Warner Bros. Discovery	Motion pictures Television broadcasting	United States	Warner Bros. Discovery (at the time WarnerMedia), announced that they have paused Warner Bros. theatrical releases in Russia, including the release of The Batman on 1 March, Later on 9 March, they shut down three networks in Russia.	1 March 2022 (Motion pictures); 9 March 2022 (Television networks)	
Paramount Global	Motion pictures	United States	Paramount announced on 1 March that it will pause theatrical releases in Russia, including the release of Sonic the Hedgehog 2, later it was announced they cancelled plans on the launch of its streaming service Paramount+ in Russia, Belarus, Ukraine and Kazakhstan.	1 March 2022 (Motion pictures)	
Universal Pictures (NBCUniversal)	Motion pictures	United States	Universal announced they would pause theatrical releases in Russia, including the release of The Bad Guys.	1 March 2022	
Netflix	Streaming service	United States	Netflix announced it would not add 20 Russian channels to their service, despite a requirement to do so under Russian law. On 4 March, it was announced that the streammer has paused all future projects and acquisitions from Russia, effectively cancelling some of those potential movies and shows. On 6 March, Netflix went even further and announced it will pull out its service from Russia altogether.	4 March 2022 (Projects and Acquisitions); 6 March 2022 (full service)	
YouTube (Google)	Video sharing service	United States	YouTube said that its immediately blocking access around the world to channels associated with Russian state-funded media, citing a policy barring content that denies, minimizes or trivializes well-documented violent events.	11 March 2022	
DirecTV	Satellite service	United States	DirecTV stopped distribution of Russian-controlled television network RT America, sister network to RT. RT America has ceased operations.	3 March 2022	
Globecast	Content distribution	United States	Globecast is disrupting the transmission of Russian-controlled television network RT to customers of Singaporean cable providers Singtel TV and Starhub TV, as well as other customers of Access Communications in Canada and Sky in New Zealand.	27 February 2022 (New Zealand); 2 March 2022 (Canada); 4 March 2022 (Singapore)	
Roku, Inc.	OTT box maker	United States	Roku, Inc. removed Russian-controlled television network RT from its stores in the US and Europe.	3 March 2022	
Discord	Social media service	United States	Discord announced that they will suspend sales of Discord Nitro to Russian customers.	17 March 2022	
TikTok	Social media service	China	TikTok had restricted access to Russian state media accounts in the European Union.	28 February 2022	
Cannes Film Festival	Film festival	France	The Cannes Film Festival stated that Russian delegation will not be welcome at its events.	2 March 2022	
Venice Film Festival	Film festival	Italy	The Venice Film Festival stated that Russian delegation will not be welcome at its events.	2 March 2022	
Glasgow Film Festival	Film festival	United Kingdom	The Glasgow Film Festival dropped two Russian films from its line-up for 2022, No Looking Back and The Execution, both receiving Russian funding.	2 March 2022	
National Association of Television Program Executives	Television trade organization	United States	The NATPE banned Russian companies from its international television trade fair in Hungary.	1 March 2022	
European Film Academy	Film organization	Germany	The EFA boycotted all Russian films.	1 March 2022	
BBC Studios (British Broadcasting Corporation)	Television production	United Kingdom	BBC Studios, All3Media (and its subsidiary company All3Media International), and ITV Studios stopped doing business with Russia, including licensing of their shows to Russian customers as well as licensing their formats for their series, including The Voice.	1 March 2022	
All3Media	Television production	United Kingdom	BBC Studios, All3Media (and its subsidiary company All3Media International), and ITV Studios stopped doing business with Russia, including licensing of their shows to Russian customers as well as licensing their formats for their series, including The Voice.	1 March 2022	
ITV Studios (ITV plc)	Television production	United Kingdom	BBC Studios, All3Media (and its subsidiary company All3Media International), and ITV Studios stopped doing business with Russia, including licensing of their shows to Russian customers as well as licensing their formats for their series, including The Voice.	1 March 2022	
European Broadcasting Union	Broadcasting consortium	Europe (HQ Switzerland)	The European Broadcasting Union excluded Russia from participating in the Eurovision Song Contest 2022, with the organisers saying its inclusion could "bring the competition into disrepute". On 26 May 2022, the Union suspended its Russian members indefinitely.	25 February 2022	
Spotify	Music streaming service	Sweden	Spotify closed its Russian office until further notice and removed all content from Russian state-owned media.	3 March 2022	
Royal Opera House	Opera house	United Kingdom	The Royal Opera House cut ties with the Bolshoi Ballet.	28 February 2022	
Metropolitan Opera	Opera house	United States	The Metropolitan Opera had cut ties with Russian performers who had voiced support for Putin, including who initially supported Putin but later opposed the invasion of Ukraine, such as soprano Anna Netrebko.	28 February 2022	
Vienna Philharmonic	Orchestra	Austria	The Vienna Philharmonic had cut ties with Russian performers who had voiced support for Putin, even those who opposed the invasion of Ukraine, including conductor Valery Gergiev, and the Bolshoi Theatre.	28 February 2022	
WWE	Wrestling promotion	United States	WWE terminated its broadcast partnership with Russian television network Match and shut down the WWE Network in Russia.	3 March 2022	
Linus Media Group	YouTube content creator	Canada	The YouTube content creator Linus Media Group had ceased working with Russian and Belarusian entities and stopped shipping merchandise from their store to those countries.	4 March 2022	
Fédération Internationale Féline (International Cat Federation)	Cat show governing body	International	The FIF banned cats bred in Russia from being imported or registered in its pedigree book outside Russia, and exhibitors living in Russia from being entered at any of its shows outside Russia, meaning cats bred in Russia or owned by Russians are banned from competitions. The restrictions are valid until the end of May.	28 February 2022	
European Tree of the Year	Event	Europe	The organizer of the European Tree of the Year put Russia out of the running for the contest, excluding the Turgenev's Oak from nomination.	28 February 2022	
Universal Music Group	Music distribution	Netherlands; United States	Universal Music Group suspended its Russian operations.	8 March 2022	
PRS for Music	Performance rights organization	United Kingdom	PRS for Music cancelled its partnership with the Russian Authors' Society (RAO).	8 March 2022	
ASCAP	Music rights organization	United States	ASCAP, BMI, and SIAE suspended their royalty payments to the Russian Authors' Society (RAO).	9 March 2022	
Broadcast Music, Inc.	Music rights organization	United States	ASCAP, BMI, and SIAE suspended their royalty payments to the Russian Authors' Society (RAO).	9 March 2022	
SIAE	Music rights organization	Italy	ASCAP, BMI, and SIAE suspended their royalty payments to the Russian Authors' Society (RAO).	9 March 2022	
Live Nation	Concert promotion	United States	Live Nation ceased its operations in Russia, leading up to its cancellation of concerts in the country.	2 March 2022	
Warner Music Group	Music distribution	United States	WMG suspended their operations in Russia.	10 March 2022	
Sony Music Entertainment	Music distribution	United States	Sony Music Entertainment is suspending their operations in Russia.	10 March 2022	
Kobalt Music Group	Music publishing	United States	Kobalt and Downtown are suspending their music publishing and business activity in Russia.	10 March 2022	
Downtown	Music publishing	United States	Kobalt and Downtown are suspending their music publishing and business activity in Russia.	10 March 2022	
Warner Bros. Discovery	Television broadcasting	United States	Warner Bros. Discovery (at the time Discovery Inc), shut down 15 networks in Russia on 9 March 2022.	9 March 2022	
Deutsche Welle	News organization	Germany	Deutsche Welle announced that they will be closing down their Moscow bureau and most of the journalists will be relocated to Riga, Latvia.	9 March 2022	
Canal+ Group	Television broadcasting	France	Canal+ Group through its subsidiary company Thema announced that the distribution of TV5MONDE Europe will be suspended in Russia.	9 March 2022	
France 24	Television broadcasting	France	France 24 suspended its broadcasts in Russia.	9 March 2022	
NHK	Television broadcasting	Japan	The public broadcaster's English language channel NHK World TV suspended its broadcasts in Russia. NHK World Premium has continued its broadcasting.	9 March 2022	
LNK	Television network	Lithuania	LNK and TV3 are removing their Russian production involvement in their programming.	4 March 2022	
TV3	Television network	Lithuania	LNK and TV3 are removing their Russian production involvement in their programming.	4 March 2022	
Telia Lietuva	Telecommunication company	Lithuania	Telia Lietuva, Cgates, and Splius stopped broadcasting Russian TV channels from their cable television services.	4 March 2022	
Cgates	Telecommunication company	Lithuania	Telia Lietuva, Cgates, and Splius stopped broadcasting Russian TV channels from their cable television services.	4 March 2022	
Splius	Telecommunication company	Lithuania	Telia Lietuva, Cgates, and Splius stopped broadcasting Russian TV channels from their cable television services.	4 March 2022	
American Kennel Club	Dog show governing body	United States	The AKC said they will not approve judges from Russia to events it holds, and will deny any new requests for imported dog registrations from the Russian Kennel Federation.	10 March 2022	
Corus Entertainment	Television broadcasting Content licensing	Canada	Corus suspended all business relations and transactions with corporations or individuals living or operating in Russia.	4 March 2022	
International Academy of Television Arts and Sciences	Television award body	United States	The International Academy of Television Arts and Science announced that all programmes produced in Russia will not be eligible at the 50th International Emmy Awards. It had previously announced that the academy had been suspending memberships from Russia as well as formal affiliations with Russian companies.	28 March 2022	
Games Workshop	Miniature wargames company	United Kingdom	Games Workshop announced that all sales of its products in Russia had been suspended in protest against the Russian invasion of Ukraine.	16 March 2022	

=== Video games and esports ===
Company	Industry	Country	Actions	Date	Ref.
Natus Vincere	Esports organization	Ukraine	NAVI had severed its partnership with Russian esport organisation ESForce with companies under ESForce Holding includes RuHub, Epic Esports Events, Cybersport.ru and Virtus.pro.	2 March 2022	
BLAST Premier	Esports league	Denmark	BLAST Premier cancelled its upcoming tournament qualifier for the CIS region and banned Russian-based teams from attending its events for the "foreseeable future".	2 March 2022	
ESL	Esports league	Germany	The ESL bans organisations with ties to the Russian government from participating in ESL Pro League, including Virtus.pro and Gambit Esports. However, the players are allowed to participate in the tournament "under a neutral name, without representing their country, organization or their teams’ sponsors on their clothing". All scheduled tournaments in the CIS region have also been paused and postponed.	6 March 2022	
Elisa Esports	Esports organizer	Finland	Elisa Esports bans all Russian-owned organisations from participating in its tournaments.	2 March 2022	
WePlay	Esports organizer	Ukraine	WePlay terminated its cooperation with all partners from the Russian Federation.	7 March 2022	
Electronic Arts	Game publishing	United States	EA halted sales of its games in both Russia and Belarus on 4 March. Previously, it had removed the Russian teams from FIFA 22, FIFA Mobile, and FIFA Online, and removed the Russian and Belarusian teams from NHL 22.	4 March 2022 (Game software sales)	
CD Projekt	Game publishing	Poland	CD Projekt had cut off sales for all of its products to Russia and Belarus, including Cyberpunk 2077 and all games on GOG.com.	3 March 2022	
Nintendo	Game publishing Console maker	Japan	Nintendo had placed the Nintendo eShop for Russia into maintenance mode, which disabled the ability to make purchases or downloads for Nintendo Switch digital games, DLC, or microtransactions on 4 March. Six days later on 10 March, the company has suspended shipments of software and hardware to Russia and has delayed the release of Advance Wars 1+2: Re-Boot Camp.	4 March 2022 (Nintendo eShop); 10 March 2022 (Shipments of game software and console hardware)	
Sony Interactive Entertainment	Game publishing Console maker	Japan	SIE pulled Gran Turismo 7 from digital and physical sale in Russia on 4 March. After facing public pressure to block their Russian player base, Sony announced on 9 March that shipments of PlayStation 5 and PlayStation 4 consoles & physical games along with shipments of software and hardware to Russia have been suspended. Moreover, the Russian PlayStation Store will be closed until further notice, meaning Russian players will be unable to purchase or download digital games, DLC, and microtransactions.	4 March 2022 (sales of Gran Turismo 7); 9 March 2022 (shipments of consoles & physical games, PlayStation Store)	
Activision Blizzard	Game publishing	United States	Activision Blizzard has halted sales of its games in Russia.	5 March 2022	
Epic Games	Game publishing	United States	Epic Games halted sale of games, including Fortnite, as well as payments to the Epic Games store is suspended in Russia. The company announced that the portion of the sales of the said game from March 20 to April 3 would go to humanitarian relief organizations working in Ukraine.	5 March 2022	
Ubisoft	Game publishing	France	Ubisoft and Take-Two announced that they suspended sales of their games in Russia.	7 March 2022	
Take-Two Interactive	Game publishing	United States	Ubisoft and Take-Two announced that they suspended sales of their games in Russia.	7 March 2022	
Rovio	Game publishing	Finland	Rovio had removed their games, including Angry Birds, from Russian and Belarusian app stores.	9 March 2022	
Supercell	Game publishing	Finland	Supercell removed their games, including Clash of Clans, from Russian and Belarusian app stores.	9 March 2022	
SCS Software	Game publishing	Czech Republic	The publisher had postponed development on the planned Heart of Russia DLC for Euro Truck Simulator 2, which was first announced in March 2021.	14 March 2022	
Niantic Labs	Game publishing	United States	Niantic Labs suspended downloads and gameplay of its games, such as Pokémon Go, in Russia and Belarus.	12 March 2022	
Valve Corporation	Software store	United States	Valve, the operator of the Steam platform, announced that they will stop payments to Russia, Ukraine and Belarus. Previously, it was criticized in early March 2022 for remaining in the Russian market despite many other foreign video game companies leaving.	17 March 2022	
PGL	Esports organizer	Romania	Virtus.pro and Gambit Esports are barred from participating in the upcoming PGL Antwerp Major and its Regional Major Ranking (RMR). Players from the affected organizations are allowed to play "under neutral names and jerseys".	9 April 2022	

=== Food and beverage ===
Company	Industry	Country	Actions	Date	Ref.
Supermarket retailers, including: Coop; Rimi; Maxima; Barbora	Supermarket	Latvia; Lithuania; Estonia	Most supermarkets removed Russian and Belarusian products, such as food, drinks, magazines, and newspapers, with the most notable supermarket chains to join the boycott.	24 February 2022 (Lithuania); 25 February 2022 (Latvia); 27 February 2022 (Estonia)	
Liquor regulation organizations including: Liquor Control Board of Ontario; Société des alcools du Québec; Newfoundland and Labrador Liquor Corporation; Manitoba Liquor & Lotteries Corporation; Nova Scotia Liquor Corporation; Saskatchewan Liquor and Gaming Authority	Government organization	Canada	The liquor control boards of several provinces, including the Liquor Control Board of Ontario, the Société des alcools du Québec, the Newfoundland and Labrador Liquor Corporation, the Manitoba Liquor & Lotteries Corporation, the Nova Scotia Liquor Corporation, and the Saskatchewan Liquor and Gaming Authority, were ordered to remove Russian alcohol products from retail stores. The government of British Columbia ceased the import of Russian liquor products, and the Liquor Control Board of Ontario announced the removal of Russian liquor from all 679 liquor retailers within its jurisdiction.	25 February 2022	
States, including: New Hampshire; Ohio; Pennsylvania; Utah; Virginia	Government regulation	United States	The governors of Ohio, New Hampshire, and Utah placed legal restrictions on the sale of Russian liquor, and many bars, restaurants, and liquor retailers have removed Russian brands from their selections voluntarily, with some supporting Ukrainian liquors in a further show of solidarity with Ukraine. The Virginia Alcoholic Beverage Control Authority pulled Russian-sourced vodka from its stores and places them into storage. Utah and New Hampshire signs executive orders removing all Russian produced and Russian-branded alcohol from its stores. The Pennsylvania Liquor Control Board no longer sells nor procures Russian products.	26 February 2022 (Florida, Utah, Virginia and New Hampshire); 28 February 2022 (Pennsylvania)	
Alko	Alcohol monopoly	Finland	Alko, Systembolaget, and Vinmonopolet, the alcohol monopolies of Finland, Sweden, and Norway, respectively, stopped the sale of Russian alcoholic beverages.	28 February 2022	
Systembolaget	Alcohol monopoly	Sweden	Alko, Systembolaget, and Vinmonopolet, the alcohol monopolies of Finland, Sweden, and Norway, respectively, stopped the sale of Russian alcoholic beverages.	28 February 2022	
Vinmonopolet	Alcohol monopoly	Norway	Alko, Systembolaget, and Vinmonopolet, the alcohol monopolies of Finland, Sweden, and Norway, respectively, stopped the sale of Russian alcoholic beverages.	1 March 2022	
Retailers, including: S-Group; Kesko	Supermarket	Finland	Finland's two main retailers removed Russian goods from their shelves.	28 February 2022	
Norgesgruppen	Retailer group	Norway	Norgesgruppen, Norway's biggest retailer group and operator behind Meny, Kiwi, Joker and Spar grocery stores removed Russian goods from their shelves.	1 March 2022	
Supermarkets, including: Coop; REMA 1000	Supermarket	Denmark	Most supermarkets removed all Russian products.	26 February 2022	
Fonterra	Dairy milk producer	New Zealand	Fonterra, one of the world's largest dairy producers, suspended shipments of all its dairy products to Russia.	28 February 2022	
Retailers, including: Aldi Süd; Coles Group; Endeavour Group (Dan Murphy's, BWS)	Retailer	Australia	Australian retailers removed all Russian made alcohol from their stores and services.	28 February 2022	
Metcash	Retail company	Australia	Metcash stops stocking all Russian made products from its company owned stores.	28 February 2022	
Nemiroff	Vodka drink	Ukraine	Nemiroff cancelled its licence for production in Russia.	6 March 2022	
Diageo	Liquor maker	France	Diageo, famous for creating products including Smirnoff vodka, paused all exports of its spirits to Russia.	3 March 2022	
Food retailers, including: Sainsbury's; Morrisons; Aldi Süd; Waitrose; The Co-op	Food retailer	United Kingdom	British food retailers have removed all Russian-made spirits, notably Russian Standard vodka from their shelves.	4 March 2022	
SPI	Liquor maker	Latvia	SPI, the holding company behind Stolichnaya vodka has said the company would rebrand its signature vodka to just Stoli, and change the source of the ingredients from Russia to Slovakia.	6 March 2022	
Fazer	Confectionery maker	Finland	Fazer had suspended all exports of its confectionery, grain and bakery products from Finland to Russia and stopped all investments. Later, the company exits all its operations in Russia.	7 March 2022	
Olvi	Beverage maker	Finland	Olvi stopped exporting to Russia and Belarus, suspended investments in Belarus and started withdrawing from the Belarusian market.	7 March 2022	
Budvar	Beer maker	Czech Republic	Budvar halted beer deliveries to Russia.	6 March 2022	
Atria	Meat	Finland	Atria, the company made famous for its meat brands such as Pit-Product and CampoMos, stopped its operations in Russia.	7 February 2022	
Danone	Food and beverage maker	France	Danone had suspending investments in Russia, but would maintain the production and distribution of fresh dairy products and infant nutrition.	7 March 2022	
Arla Foods	Dairy milk producer	Denmark	Arla Foods, one of the world's largest dairy producers, suspending its business operations and imports in Russia.	7 March 2022	
Valio	Dairy milk	Finland	Valio had stopped all exports from Finland to Russia and Belarus. Later, the company closed its business operation in Russia, including imports to Finland.	7 March 2022	
Paulig	Food and beverage	Finland	The Finnish-based food and beverage company had withdrawed from Russia.	7 March 2022	
Yum Brands	Restaurant franchising group	United States	Yum Brands, which has 1,000 KFC and Pizza Hut franchises in Russia, had faced criticism for not joining the boycott earlier, announced on 9 March that it would suspend all investment and restaurant development in the country. It also announced it would suspend operations of company-owned KFC restaurants and will make arrangements to suspend Pizza Hut restaurant operations.	9 March 2022	
McDonald's	Fast food restaurant	United States	McDonald's, which had been criticised for not joining the boycott, announced on 8 March it would temporarily close 850 locations in Russia, but would continue to pay its 62,000 Russian employees. On 27 May, it was announced that the company would sell its Russian restaurants to licensee Alexander Govor, who rebranded them as Vkusno & tochka. This company operative also in Belarus since November 2022.	8 March 2022	
Starbucks	Coffee shops	United States	Likewise, after being criticised for not joining the boycott, the company announced on 8 March it was suspending all business activity in Russia and would pause store operations at its 130 locations in the country. CEO Kevin Johnson further explained financial support would be provided to affected employees.	8 March 2022	
The Coca-Cola Company	Beverage maker	United States	Coca-Cola, following several days of public pressure, announced on 8 March 2022 it was "suspending its business in Russia".	8 March 2022	
PepsiCo	Beverage maker	United States	PepsiCo, which also initially resisted boycott calls, announced in a letter from CEO Ramon Laguarta, said that the "suspension of the sale of Pepsi-Cola, and our global beverage brands in Russia, including 7Up and Mirinda[,]... capital investments and all advertising and promotional activities in Russia." However, PepsiCo maintained it had a "responsibility" to continue to sell "milk and other dairy offerings, baby formula and baby food", and "by continuing to operate, we will also continue to support the livelihoods of our 20,000 Russian associates and the 40,000 Russian agricultural workers in our supply chain".	8 March 2022	
Heineken N.V.	Beer	Netherlands	Heineken has stopped the production and sale of its namesake brand of beer in Russia. It had previously announced a suspension on new investments and exports to Russia. A number of local Russian brands continue operating, but they will be financially isolated from the main company.	9 March 2022	
Carlsberg Group	Beer	Denmark	Carlsberg has suspended further investments in, and exports to or from, Russia. Production and sale of its namesake brand of beer has been stopped. The local Russian Baltika brands continues operating, but any potential profits will be forwarded to humanitarian organisations.	9 March 2022	
Lindt	Candy maker	Switzerland	Lindt temporarily closed their shops and suspended all of their deliveries to Russia.	9 March 2022	
Brown–Forman	Liquor maker	United States	Brown–Forman, owners of several brands including Jack Daniel's and Finlandia Vodka, suspended commercial operations in Russia.	9 March 2022	
Nestlé	Food and beverage maker	Switzerland	Nestlé had suspended all capital investment in Russia on March 9, 2022. Two weeks later, amid public pressure, the company would suspend advertising, imports and exports of non-essential brands such as Nesquik and KitKat, and overall profits in the country of Russia. Essential products such as baby formula and hospital nutrition continue to be sold, with all profits being directed towards humanitarian organizations.	2 March 2022 (advertising, imports and exports on non-essential brands); 9 March 2022 (capital investment)	
Papa John's	Fast food restaurant	United States	Papa John's has suspended all corporate operations in Russia, but it will still have 188 independent franchisee-owned stores in Russia, but it has halted all operational, marketing and business support to Russia.	9 March 2022	
KFC	Fast food restaurant	United States	After pressure from Alaskan legislators, the Alaska Permanent Fund announced it will not purchase any new Russian securities and will look to divest its Russian portfolio, consisting of US$63m in fixed income, US$153m in public equities and US$2.7m in private equity.	October 2022	
Kraft Heinz	Condiment maker	United States	Kraft Heinz, which sells ketchup and other condiments in Russia, is suspending all new investments in Russia, as well as all exports and imports of its products into and out of Russia.	8 March 2022	
Little Caesars	Fast food restaurant	United States	Little Caesars halts all operations at Russian stores, which are owned by franchisees.	9 March 2022	
Mars, Incorporated	Food and animal care maker	United States	Mars, the food and animal care corporation including the maker of M&M's and Snickers, had expanding production in Russia in August 2021, announced on 1 March that they will suspending advertising in Russia and Belarus, but will continue to produce goods at its factories, including in five facilities that produce its pet food. Later on 10 March the company suspended new investments in Russia and will not import or export their products in or out of Russia, but it will refocus their efforts in Russia on their "essential role in feeding the Russian people and pets."	1 March 2022 (advertising); 10 March 2022 (investments)	
Mondelez International	Food and beverage maker	United States	Mondelez International announced that has scaled back all non-essential activities in Russia, but it will continue helping maintain the food supply during the invasion.	9 March 2022 (non-essential activities only)	
Kellogg's	Cereal maker	United States	Kellogg's, a company that specializes on cereals and operates several plants in Russia; announced that the company has suspended all shipments and investments in Russia.	8 March 2022	
Burger King	Fast food restaurant	United States	Burger King, a fast food franchise, called for suspension of all of its 880 franchised locations in Russia.	10 March 2022	
National Mustard Museum	Museum	United States	National Mustard Museum removed Russian mustards from exhibition, saying the mustards will be back "once the invasion of Ukraine is over and Russia recognizes and respects the sovereign nation of Ukraine" on a sign. The museum reverted the removal after the incident went viral online, saying Russian mustard makers are not responsible for the Ukrainian War.	15 March 2022	

=== Goods ===
==== Automotive ====
Company	Industry	Country	Actions	Date	Ref.
Ford Motor Company	Cars	United States	Ford suspended all sales and operations in Russia.	28 February 2022	
General Motors	Cars	United States	GM, the maker of Chevrolet, Buick, Cadillac and GMC vehicles, suspended all sales and operations in Russia.	28 February 2022	
Jaguar Cars	Cars	United Kingdom	Jaguar suspended all sales and operations in Russia.	28 February 2022	
Volvo	Cars	Sweden	Volvo suspended all sales and operations in Russia.	28 February 2022	
Honda	Cars	Japan	Honda suspended all exports to Russia.	28 February 2022	
Toyota	Cars	Japan	Toyota announced it halted production at its plant in Saint Petersburg and ceased all shipments to Russia.	3 March 2022	
Mazda	Cars	Japan	Mazda suspended shipments of parts to Russia.	28 February 2022	
Mitsubishi Motors	Cars	Japan	Mitsubishi Motors assessed the risk of operating in Russia. Mitsubishi operates a small plant in partnership with Stellantis in Kaluga, southwest of Moscow. The plant employs about 2,700 people and produces small delivery vans.	28 February 2022	
Volkswagen	Cars	Germany	Volkswagen suspended production at Kaluga and Nizhny Novgorod sites and also stopped exports to Russia.	3 March 2022	
Nissan	Cars	Japan	Nissan is halting work at its factory in the Russian city of St. Petersburg. Earlier it had suspended vehicle exports to Russia.	7 March 2022	
Stellantis	Cars	Netherlands	Stellantis, the maker of Jeep, Fiat and Peugeot vehicles, has suspended exports of cars from Russia and imports of vehicles into the country. It operates a small plant in partnership with Mitsubishi in Kaluga, southwest of Moscow. The plant employs about 2,700 people and produces small delivery vans.	10 March 2022	
Hyundai Motor Company	Cars	South Korea	Hyundai, which produces about 200,000 cars in Russia annually, was criticized for not joining the boycott early. On 1 March, it announced suspension of production in Russia but sales have not paused. Hyundai holds a 70% stake in the Hyundai Motor Manufacturing Rus plant in St. Petersburg which is being sold in December 2023.	1 March 2022 (suspension of production)	
Daimler Truck Holding AG	Trucks	Germany	Daimler Truck Holding AG discontinued business activities in Russia and reviewed ties with Kamaz.	28 February 2022	
Harley-Davidson	Motorcycle	United States	Harley-Davidson suspended all business in Russia.	3 March 2022	
Yamaha Motor Company	Motorcycle	Japan	Yamaha Motor Company suspended cycling exports in Russia.	4 March 2022	

==== Apparel and accessories ====
Company	Industry	Country	Actions	Date	Ref.
Nike, Inc.	Sports clothing	United States	Nike halted all online sales in Russia, stating it could not guarantee delivery of products. However, its stores throughout Russia were open on 11 March, more than a week after the sports retailer said it was temporarily closing down all its approximately 100 shops in the country. On 23 June 2022, Nike announced that it would fully exit Russia.	1 March 2022 (online sales); 11 March 2022 (retail stores); 23 June 2022 (full exit)	
Adidas	Sports clothing	Germany	Adidas announced on 1 March that it suspend its kit partnership with Russian Football Union, but it later announced on 9 March that most of its 500 stores operating in Russia, had closed them along with online sales there.	1 March 2022 (Russian Football Union partnership); 9 March 2022 (Retail stores)	
H&M	Clothing	Sweden	H&M and Burberry paused all sales in Russia.	3 March 2022	
Burberry	Clothing	United Kingdom	Burberry paused all sales in Russia.	3 March 2022	
YOOX Net-a-Porter Group	E-commerce	Italy	YOOX Net-a-Porter Group, operator of Net-A-Porter, YOOX, The Outnet and Mr. Porter, and Farfetch had suspended deliveries in the country.	2 March 2022	
Farfetch	E-commerce	United KingdomPortugal	Farfetch had suspended deliveries in the country.	2 March 2022	
LVMH	Fashion retailer group	France	LVMH, operator of fashion retail brands Dior, Givenchy, Fendi, Sephora and Bulgari and has 124 stores in Russia, announced that they will close all of their stores in Russia.	4 March 2022	
Hermès	Fashion retailer	France	Hermès announced that they will close 3 stores in Russia.	4 March 2022	
Chanel	Fashion retailer	France	Chanel announced that they will close 17 stores in Russia.	4 March 2022	
Kering	Fashion retailer group	France	Kering, operator of fashion retail brands Gucci, Yves Saint Laurent, Bottega Veneta, and Balenciaga, announced that they will close all of their stores in Russia.	4 March 2022	
Richemont	Fashion retailer group	Switzerland	Richemont, operator of fashion retail brands Cartier, Buccellati, Piaget and Montblanc, announced that they will close all of their stores in Russia.	4 March 2022	
ASOS	Online fashion retailer	United Kingdom	ASOS and Boohoo.com suspended sales in Russia.	2 March 2022	
Boohoo.com	Online fashion retailer	United Kingdom	ASOS and Boohoo.com suspended sales in Russia.	2 March 2022	
Marks & Spencer	Retail	United Kingdom	Marks & Spencer has stopped shipments to its Russian franchise stores, and is donating £500 000 ($666,000, €605 000) to UNHCR.	3 March 2022	
Zara (Inditex)	Luxury clothing	Spain	Inditex, the owner of Zara, is temporarily closing all its shops in Russia and halting online sales.	5 March 2022	
TJX	Retail company	United States	TJX sells its 25% stake in Russian clothing retailer Familia.	4 March 2022	
Puma	Fashion retailer	Germany	Puma suspends operation of all its stores in Russia.	5 March 2022	
Prada	Fashion retailer	Italy	Prada suspended retail operations in Russia.	5 March 2022	
Reserved (LPP)	Luxury clothing	Poland	LPP, the owner of Reserved, suspended all of its business activities in Russia. The company has around 500 stores in Russia.	4 March 2022	
Canada Goose	Clothing	Canada	Canada Goose suspended all wholesale and e-commerce sales in Russia.	2 March 2022	
Levi Strauss & Co	Jeans	United States	Levis suspended its Russian operations, including any new investments.	6 March 2022	
Rolex	Watch	Switzerland	Rolex announced a halt of its exports to Russia.	8 March 2022	
Victoria's Secret	Underwear	United States	Victoria's Secret suspended its business in Russia.	10 March 2022	
Crocs	Footwear	United States	Crocs pausing its direct-to-consumer business, inclusive of e-commerce and retail operations, in Russia. It will also pause the importation of goods into the country.	2 March 2022	
Uniqlo (Fast Retailing)	Clothing	Japan	Fast Retailing, the clothing giant that owns Uniqlo, announced that they will temporarily suspend their operations after some initial resistance. When asked about the possibility of closing Uniqlo in Russia, CEO Tadashi Yanai told Nikkei Asia "clothing is a necessity of life," and "the people of Russia have the same right to live as we do." The company later announced on 10 March said that operational challenges and a worsening of the conflict forced it to temporarily suspend operations.	10 March 2022	

==== Other ====
Company	Industry	Country	Actions	Date	Ref.
IKEA	Retail	Sweden	IKEA closed their 17 stores in Russia and halted sourcing materials from Russia and Belarus, but its 14 malls in Russia, branded "Mega", remain open. IKEA's decision to close their stores led to Russian consumers panic buying furniture and home appliances on the final day of the store's operations in the country.	3 March 2022 (Furniture stores)	
Jysk	Retail	Denmark	Jysk closed their stores in Russia.	3 March 2022	
British Land	Land leasing	United Kingdom	British Land will terminate its rental contract with Gazprom's global trading arm based in central London. Gazprom Marketing & Trading (GM&T) had occupied the top floors of 20 Triton Street in Regent's Park.	7 March 2022	
Solvay S.A.	Chemicals	Belgium	Solvay S.A. suspended operations or investment in the country.	7 March 2022	
Fiskars Group	Consumer products	Finland	Fiskars Group has decided to withdraw completely from the Russian market.	7 March 2022	
Kemira	Chemicals	Finland	Kemira discontinued deliveries to Russia and Belarus, primarily impacting pulp and paper customers in Russia.	1 March 2022	
The Estée Lauder Companies	Cosmetics	United States	Estée Lauder, manufacturer and marketer of skin care, makeup, fragrance and hair care products, announced on 7 March they have also decided to suspend all commercial activity in the country, closing every store they own and operate including their brand sites as well as ceasing shipments to any of their retailers in Russia. Later, they initially suspended the company's business investments and initiatives in Russia.	7 March 2022	
Procter & Gamble	Conglomerate	United States	P&G is ending all new capital investments in Russia and "significantly reducing" its portfolio there.	7 March 2022	
The Lego Group	Toy maker	Denmark	The Lego Group stopped deliveries of their products to Russia. Lego does not own stores in the country; 81 Russian Lego stores are owned and run by the local Inventive Retail Group, but they will not receive further shipments. The company meanwhile announced it will donate funds in collaboration with The LEGO Foundation and Ole Kirk's Fond to UNICEF, Save the Children, and the Danish Red Cross for $16.5 million.	5 March 2022	
Horst Brandstätter Group	Toy maker	Germany	The Horst Brandstätter Group, the company behind Playmobil and Lechuza, announced that they halted sales and deliveries of these products to Russia.	2 March 2022	
Mattel	Toy maker	United States	Mattel, one of the largest toy makers in America, most notably creating products like Barbie, Hot Wheels and Polly Pocket among others, announced that they paused all shipments into Russia and contributed $1 million in toys and cash to support organizations on the front lines including Save the Children and Polish local charities SOS Children's Villages and Caritas Polska. the company also announced that they launching a special retailer sales program in Europe with 100% of the proceeds of key products to be donated to other charities in neighbouring countries including Poland and Czech Republic.	10 March 2022	
Moose Toys	Toy maker	United States	Moose Toys announced that they will suspend distribution of toys to Russia and it will donating $100,000 to Save the Children and it also supporting Dream Doctors to sending clown doctors to the children of the Ukraine-Moldova border.	28 February 2022	
YIT	Construction	Finland	YIT, Finland's biggest construction company, discontinued construction material purchases from Russia and has halted investments in plots or start up new apartments in Russia.	3 March 2022	
Metsä Group	Forest products	Finland	Metsä Group has discontinued its operations in Russia. Wood procurement in Russia for the Svir sawmill and imports to Metsä Group's Finnish and Swedish mills has also been discontinued.	10 March 2022	
Stora Enso	Paper and packaging	Finland	Stora Enso, a provider of renewable products in packaging, biomaterials, wooden construction and paper, had stopped all production and sales in Russia and all export and import to and from Russia.	8 March 2022	
UPM	Forest industry	Finland	UPM had ceased deliveries to Russia, but announced operations at its Russian sites continue. The company later announced they will suspend purchasing of wood in and from Russia as well as the UPM Chudovo plywood mill operations for the time being.	8 March 2022 (deliveries); 9 March 2022 (plywood mill operations)	
Unilever	Conglomerate	United Kingdom; Netherlands	Unilever suspends all investments, imports and exports into and out of Russia, but will continue to supply everyday essential food and hygiene products made in Russia to people in the country.	9 March 2022	
L'Oréal	Cosmetics	France	L'Oréal, the world's largest cosmetics company, said it will temporarily close its stores, e-commerce sites, and directly operated department store counters in Russia.	7 March 2022	
Mothercare	Retail	United Kingdom	Mothercare suspends business in Russia.	9 March 2022	
Imperial Brands	Conglomerate	United Kingdom	Imperial Brands, a tobacco company, halted production, sales and marketing of its products in Russia.	9 March 2022	
Philip Morris International	Tobacco	United States	Philip Morris International, a tobacco company which has 3,200 workers in Russia, suspends investments in Russia and scales back manufacturing, but is continuing to pay salaries to all its employees in Russia.	9 March 2022	
Shopify	E-commerce	Canada	Shopify had suspend Russian operations.	9 March 2022	
Rio Tinto	Mining	United Kingdom; Australia	Rio Tinto is in the process of terminating all commercial relationships it has with any Russian business, but it did not immediately respond to questions on whether it would continue to buy Russian fuel and other products through non-Russian third parties.	10 March 2022	
3M	Conglomerate	United States	3M is suspending all of its business operations in Russia, where it operates at least one factory.	10 March 2022	
Inglot Cosmetics	Cosmetics	Poland	Inglot Cosmetics announced it stopped shipments of its products to the company's stores in Russia and undertook legal measures to ban the use of the company's trademark across Russia.	24 February 2022	
Tata Steel	Steel	India	Tata Steel said that its steel manufacturing sites in India, the UK and the Netherlands would sourced alternative supplies of raw materials to end its dependence on Russia.	20 April 2022	

=== Services ===
Company	Industry	Country	Actions	Date	Ref.
White & Case	Law firm	United States	White & Case, Baker McKenzie, and Morgan, Lewis, & Bockius reviewed and ended Russian-related operations and clients.	1 March 2022	
Baker McKenzie	Law firm	United States	White & Case, Baker McKenzie, and Morgan, Lewis, & Bockius reviewed and ended Russian-related operations and clients.	1 March 2022	
Morgan, Lewis & Bockius	Law firm	United States	White & Case, Baker McKenzie, and Morgan, Lewis, & Bockius reviewed and ended Russian-related operations and clients.	1 March 2022	
Sidley Austin	Law firm	United States	Sidley Austin and Venable LLP terminated registrations to lobby in Washington for sanctioned financial institutions.	1 March 2022	
Venable LLP	Law firm	United States	Sidley Austin and Venable LLP terminated registrations to lobby in Washington for sanctioned financial institutions.	1 March 2022	
The Big Four accounting firms, including: KPMG; Ernst & Young; PricewaterhouseCoopers; Deloitte	Accounting firm	United Kingdom	The Big Four accounting firms reduced their activity in Russia. Consulting company KPMG ended some Russian client relationships. Ernst & Young (EY) and PricewaterhouseCoopers (PwC) separated their Russian firms from the global network. Deloitte, the largest member of the Big Four, separated their practices in Russia and Belarus and removed them from the global network, effectively ceasing Deloitte operations in these two countries. The Deloitte action has affected about 3,000 employees in the Russian and Belarusian firms.	3 March 2022 (KPMG); 7 March 2022 (other firms)	
Accenture	Technology consulting firm	Ireland	Accenture discontinued all its Russian business affecting about 2,300 Russian employees.	3 February 2022	
Infosys	Technology consulting firm	India	Infosys announced on that it would be moving its business out of Russia.	13 April 2022	
Grant Thornton International	Accounting firm	United States	Grant Thornton International announced its Russian member firm is leaving the network, noting it had done work for Gazprom and the Central Bank of Russia.	2 March 2022	
AECOM	Engineering firm	United States	AECOM announced it will immediately exit from its Russia business.	7 March 2022	
OneWeb	Satellite Internet access	United Kingdom	OneWeb suspended all launches from Russia's Baikonur Cosmodrome and reviewed all projects involving Russian collaboration. This came after Russian Director of Roscosmos, Dmitry Rogozin, demanded OneWeb provide a guarantee that its satellites were not going to be used against Russia.	3 March 2022	

=== Shipping and transport ===
Company	Industry	Country	Actions	Date	Ref.
United Parcel Service	Freight courier	United States	UPS, DHL, and FedEx announced they would halt shipments to Russia.	27 February 2022	
DHL	Freight courier	Germany	UPS, DHL, and FedEx announced they would halt shipments to Russia.	27 February 2022	
FedEx	Freight courier	United States	UPS, DHL, and FedEx announced they would halt shipments to Russia.	27 February 2022	
Maersk	Container shipping	Denmark	Maersk, MSC, CMA CGM, Hapag-Lloyd, and ONE are container shipping companies from Denmark, Switzerland, France, Germany, and Japan, respectively, and are some of the largest container shipping companies in the world; all five halted all container shipping to Russia, except for basic food products, medicine and humanitarian aid.	1 March 2022	
Mediterranean Shipping Company	Container shipping	Switzerland	Maersk, MSC, CMA CGM, Hapag-Lloyd, and ONE are container shipping companies from Denmark, Switzerland, France, Germany, and Japan, respectively, and are some of the largest container shipping companies in the world; all five halted all container shipping to Russia, except for basic food products, medicine and humanitarian aid.	1 March 2022	
CMA CGM	Container shipping	France	Maersk, MSC, CMA CGM, Hapag-Lloyd, and ONE are container shipping companies from Denmark, Switzerland, France, Germany, and Japan, respectively, and are some of the largest container shipping companies in the world; all five halted all container shipping to Russia, except for basic food products, medicine and humanitarian aid.	1 March 2022	
Hapag-Lloyd	Container shipping	Germany	Maersk, MSC, CMA CGM, Hapag-Lloyd, and ONE are container shipping companies from Denmark, Switzerland, France, Germany, and Japan, respectively, and are some of the largest container shipping companies in the world; all five halted all container shipping to Russia, except for basic food products, medicine and humanitarian aid.	1 March 2022	
Ocean Network Express	Container shipping	Japan	Maersk, MSC, CMA CGM, Hapag-Lloyd, and ONE are container shipping companies from Denmark, Switzerland, France, Germany, and Japan, respectively, and are some of the largest container shipping companies in the world; all five halted all container shipping to Russia, except for basic food products, medicine and humanitarian aid.	1 March 2022	
Finnlines	Shipping operator	Finland	Finnlines, a Finnish shipping operator of ro-ro and passenger services, suspends its services to and from Russia.	9 March 2022	

==== Aviation ====
Company	Industry	Country	Actions	Date	Ref.
Airbus	Aircraft manufacturing	Netherlands	Airbus suspended support for Russian airlines, and suspended services provided by the Airbus Engineering Centre in Russia.	2 March 2022	
Boeing	Aircraft manufacturing	United States	Boeing announced it had suspended 'major operations' in Russia, including support for Russian airlines. It has also suspended buying titanium from Russia.	7 March 2022	
Delta Air Lines	Airline	United States	Delta Air Lines suspended its codeshare agreement with Russian flag carrier Aeroflot.	25 February 2022	
Alaska Airlines	Airline	United States	Alaska Airlines suspended its mileage partnership with S7 Airlines, and interline relationships with Aeroflot and S7 Airlines.	1 March 2022	
Embraer	Aircraft manufacturing	Brazil	Embraer announced the halting of supply of parts and aircraft to Russia.	3 March 2022	
Sabre Corporation	Travel technology	United States	Sabre Corporation terminated its agreement with Aeroflot.	3 March 2022	
Amadeus CRS	Travel technology	Spain	Amadeus CRS suspended Russian state-backed airlines, including Aeroflot and S7 Airlines.	3 March 2022	
Avia Solutions Group	Aircraft manufacturing	Cyprus	Avia Solutions Group suspended all operations in Russia.	4 March 2022	

==== Space ====
Continued international collaboration on missions to the International Space Station (ISS) has been thrown into doubt.

A petition to withdraw international support from Russian satellite navigation system GLONASS and boycott the platform has been proposed by Polish engineer Daniel Kucharski from University of Texas at Austin and signed by tens of thousands of individuals. It is now being considered by ILRS.

=== Sports ===
Full boycotts

Organisation	Role	Country	Actions	Date	Ref.
International Olympic Committee	Sports competition governing body	Worldwide	The IOC called upon international sporting federations to either move or cancel any sports events planned in Russia or Belarus. It recommended sports federations and organisers not invite or allow the participation of Russian and Belarusian athletes and officials in international competitions.	25 February 2022	
International Paralympics Committee	Sports competition governing body	Worldwide	The IPC banned Russian and Belarusian para-athletes from the 2022 Winter Paralympics in Beijing, following threats of boycotts by other nations.	3 March 2022	
Governments	Governments	United States; Canada; Japan; Australia; New Zealand; Europe	Government officials from 37 countries signed a joint statement asking sports federations to ban Russian athletes and teams from competing in other countries, supporting the position by the International Olympic Committee and the International Paralympics Committee. Signatories include United States, Canada, Australia, New Zealand, Japan and multiple European countries.	8 March 2022	
Sports governing bodies, including: World Archery Federation (WAF); World Athletics, International Biathlon Union (IBU); Union Cycliste Internationale (UCI); Badminton World Federation (BWF); International Canoe Federation (ICF); International Handball Federation (IHF); International Modern Pentathlon Union (UPIM); World Rowing; International Surfing Association (ISA); World Sailing; International Shooting Sport Federation (ISSF); International Skating Union (ISU); International Table Tennis Federation (ITTF); World Triathlon; International Weightlifting Federation (IWF); United World Wrestling; International Bobsleigh and Skeleton Federation (IBSF); International Luge Federation (ILF); International Gymnastics Federation (FIG)	Sports governing body	Worldwide	The WAF, World Athletics, the IBU, the UCI, the BWF, the ICF, the IHF, the UPIM, World Rowing, the ISA, World Sailing, the ISSF, the ISU, the ITTF, World Triathlon, the IWF, United World Wrestling, the IBSF, the ILF and the FIG banned Russian and Belarusian athletes from participating in their events, in line with the IOC's recommendation.	26 February 2022 (FIG and UCI); 28 February 2022 (UPIM); 1 March 2022 (World Rowing, World Sailing, ICF, BWF and ISA) 2 March 2022 (United World Wrestling and World Athletics); 3 March 2022 (IWF, ISU, and WAF)	
All England Lawn Tennis and Croquet Club (AELTC) Lawn Tennis Association (LTA)	Tennis governing body	United Kingdom	Russian and Belarusian athletes were banned from participating in the 2022 Wimbledon Championships and other tennis events in the United Kingdom. This was despite the worldwide governing bodies allowing athletes to play under a neutral flag. In retaliation for the unilateral decision, the bodies stripped ranking points from the Wimbledon tournament and levied fines against both organisations. A decision is yet to be made as to whether this ban will continue into the 2023 tournament.	20 April 2022	
Estonian Tennis Association	Tennis governing body	Estonia	The Estonian Government, and Estonian Tennis Association banned Russian and Belarusian players from entering tennis tournaments in the country. This affected the 2022 Tallinn Open, as well as a number of smaller ITF tournaments.	18 July 2022	
World Skate	Roller sports governing body	Worldwide	World Skate banned all Russian and Belarusian athletes and officials from participating in competitions sanctioned by World Skate. Before the ban, World Skate initially allowed Russian and Belarusian athletes to compete as neutrals.	2 April 2022	
International Federation of Sport Climbing (ISFC)	Sport climbing governing body	Worldwide	The IFSC banned all Russian and Belarusian climbers from competing in IFSC competitions until further notice. Furthermore, it stripped Russian city Moscow from hosting one of the events at the 2022 IFSC Climbing World Cup.	1 March 2022	
Fédération Internationale de Volleyball (FIVB)	Volleyball governing body	Worldwide	The FIVB declared all Russian and Belarusian club and national teams won't be eligible to compete in FIVB competitions until further notice. Furthermore, FIVB stripped Russia of its hosting rights of the 2022 FIVB Volleyball Men's World Championship.	1 March 2022	
European Volleyball Confederation (CEV)	Volleyball governing body	Europe	The CEV declared all Russian and Belarusian club and national teams won't be eligible to compete in CEV competitions until further notice.	1 March 2022	
World Rugby	Rugby governing body	Worldwide	World Rugby and Rugby Europe banned all Russian and Belarusian national and club teams from its competitions and suspended both countries' memberships indefinitely.	3 March 2022	
Rugby Europe	Rugby governing body	Europe	World Rugby and Rugby Europe banned all Russian and Belarusian national and club teams from its competitions and suspended both countries' memberships indefinitely.	3 March 2022	
International Ice Hockey Federation (IIHF)	Ice Hockey governing body	Worldwide	The IIHF suspended all Russian and Belarusian national and club teams from its competitions and stripped Russia of hosting rights for both the 2023 World Junior Ice Hockey Championships and the 2023 IIHF World Championship.	3 March 2022 & 26 April 2022	
World Curling Federation (WCF)	Curling governing body	Worldwide	The WCF proposed a rule to ban Russian athletes and moved the 2022 European Curling Championships away from Perm.	28 February 2022	
International Federation for Equestrian Sports (FEI)	Equestrian governing body	Worldwide	The FEI removed all events from Russia and Belarus and an indefinite ban on participation by Russian and Belarusian athletes, horses, and officials in FEI events.	28 February 2022 (events); 2 March 2022 (Athletes, Horses & Officials ban)	
Fédération Internationale d'Escrime (FIE)	Fencing governing body	Worldwide	The FIE, which governs fencing, banned all Russian and Belarusian athletes. Ukraine pulled out of the 2022 Fencing World Cup to avoid facing Russia.	4 March 2022	
World Taekwondo	Taekwondo governing body	Worldwide	World Taekwondo banned Russian and Belarusian athletes from competing at its events and will no longer organise or recognise events in Russia and Belarus. Furthermore, it stripped Vladimir Putin of the honorary black belt given to him in 2013.	2 March 2022 (stripping of Putin's honorary black belt); 3 March 2022 (athletes ban and hosting of events)	
The R&A	Golf governing body	Canada; South America (excluding Mexico); Europe; Asia	The R&A, which governs golf outside the U.S. and Mexico, announced it would decline applications from Russian and Belarusian golfers for scheduled events.	4 March 2022	
International World Games Association	Sports competition governing body	Worldwide	The IWGA banned Russian and Belarusian athletes and officials from participating in the 2022 World Games.	1 March 2022	
FINA (World Aquatics)	Swimming governing body	Worldwide	On 25 February, FINA, the international governing body for aquatic sports, removed the FINA Water Polo World League match between Russia and Greece scheduled to take place in Saint Petersburg on 8 March from the calendar, as well as cancelled a 2022 FINA Diving World Series event and a 2022 FINA Artistic Swimming World Series event, scheduled to be the first ever joint event between the two World Series to take place in Kazan in April. It withdrew the FINA Order awarded to Vladimir Putin in 2014 on 1 March 2022, the same day it announced athletes and officials from both Belarus and Russia would not be allowed to compete using their country's name, colours, nor anthem at any FINA events indefinitely. The 2022 FINA World Junior Swimming Championships scheduled for August in Kazan was initially cancelled before being announced it would change host. On 8 March, FINA implemented a protocol for individual review of athletes deemed to be of concern for the safety and well-being of participants at its competitions. On 23 March, FINA later banned all Russian and Belarusian athletes and officials from taking part at the 2022 World Aquatics Championships and withdrew the 2022 FINA World Swimming Championships (25 m) from being held in Kazan. Furthermore, it opened a disciplinary procedure against Russian swimmer Evgeny Rylov for his alleged participation in the 2022 Moscow rally. On 20 April 2022, FINA suspended Rylov from FINA competitions and activities for nine months and banned all Russian and Belarusian athletes and officials from all FINA events through the end of 2022. On 5 April 2023, it announced the ban on Russian and Belarusian athletes from its competitions was in effect indefinitely.	25 February 2022 (scheduled events); 1 March 2022 (stripping of Putin's FINA Order award); 8 March 2022 (individual athlete review protocol); 23 March 2022 (athletes and officials ban and the withdrawal of 2022 FINA World Swimming Championships (25 m) hosting); 20 April 2022 (individual athlete suspension, athletes and officials ban); 5 April 2023 (athletes ban extended from 2022)	
LEN	Swimming governing body	Europe	LEN, the governing body for aquatic sports in Europe, banned all athletes and officials from Russia and Belarus from taking part in their competitions, as well as announced withholding LEN events from taking place in either country.	3 March 2022	
British Cycling	Cycling governing body	United Kingdom	Russian and Belarusian cyclists were banned from all events in the United Kingdom by British Cycling.	3 March 2022	
Royal Dutch Skating Federation (KNSB)	Skating governing body	Netherlands	Russian and Belarusian skaters were banned from all events organized by the KNSB and KNWU.	28 February 2022	
Royal Dutch Cycling Union (KNWU)	Cycling governing body	Netherlands	Russian and Belarusian skaters were banned from all events organized by the KNSB and KNWU.	2 March 2022	

Partial boycotts

Organisation	Role	Country	Actions	Date	Ref.
UEFA	Association football governing body	Europe	UEFA, the European governing body for football, decided to relocate the Champions League final from Saint Petersburg to Saint-Denis, France, after a meeting of the body's executive committee. The national football teams of Poland, the Czech Republic, and Sweden refused to play against Russia. On 28 February, after criticism for its decision and a prospect of boycotts by multiple countries, UEFA went further and indefinitely suspended Russian teams from playing international football. On 4 March, Russia appealed suspensions by UEFA to the Court of Arbitration for Sport. However, on 15 March, the appeal for the UEFA suspension was later upheld.	15 March 2022 (official suspension)	
FIFA	Association football governing body	Worldwide	On 27 February, FIFA announced that Russian teams would have to play as "Football Union of Russia", without flags or anthems; moreover, any "home" games would be played at a neutral site without fans. On 28 February, after criticism for its decision and a prospect of boycotts by multiple countries, FIFA went further and indefinitely suspended Russian teams from playing international football. On 4 March, Russia appealed suspensions by FIFA to the Court of Arbitration for Sport. However, on 18 March, the appeal for the FIFA suspension was later upheld.	18 March 2022 (official suspension)	
Formula One	Motorsport league	Worldwide	Formula One called off the 2022 Russian Grand Prix, with world champions Sebastian Vettel and Max Verstappen calling it "wrong" to race in the country. It also cancelled its contract with the promoter for races in Russia, which ran through 2025.	3 March 2022 (removal of Russian GP)	
Fédération Internationale de l'Automobile (FIA)	Motorsport governing body	Worldwide	The FIA announced that while Russian and Belarusian teams were banned from competing, Russian and Belarusian drivers are still allowed to compete under a neutral flag, while releasing a series of guidelines.	2 March 2022	
Motorsport UK	Motorsport governing body	United Kingdom	Motorsport UK barred Russian and Belarusian drivers from competing in British motorsport events, including the upcoming British Grand Prix in July.	2 March 2022	
Haas F1 Team	Racing team	United States	The Haas F1 Team ended their sponsorship agreements with Russian chemical company Uralkali, and the team terminated the contract of their Russian driver Nikita Mazepin, getting replaced by Kevin Magnussen.	5 March 2022	
Hitech Grand Prix	Racing team	United Kingdom	F1 support series team Hitech Grand Prix ended their sponsorship agreement with Russian chemical company Uralkali.	11 March 2022	
International Judo Federation	Judo governing body	Worldwide	The IJF suspended President Putin's status as "Honorary President and Ambassador of the International Judo Federation" on 27 February. It also cancelled all judo competitions in Russia on 7 March. Russian athletes would be allowed to participate in IJF events only under the IJF flag, logo and anthem. Then, on 2 March, the IJF removed Putin and Russian billionaire Arkady Rotenberg, the development manager of the IJF Executive Committee, from all positions.	27 February 2022 (suspension of Putin's "Honorary President and Ambassador" status); 2 March 2022 (cancelation of judo competitions); 7 March 2022 (resignation of Rotenberg as development manager of the IJF Executive Committee)	
National Hockey League	Hockey league	North America	The NHL announced that it was suspending all Russian business relationships, pausing Russian language websites, and would not host future competitions in Russia. Russian players are still allowed to play.	28 February 2022	
Jokerit	Hockey team	Finland	Jokerit withdrew from the 2021–2022 playoffs in Russia's top-tier Kontinental Hockey League, and then from the league entirely.	28 February 2022	
Dinamo Riga	Hockey team	Latvia	Dinamo Riga withdrew from Russia's top-tier Kontinental Hockey League.	28 February 2022	
International Hockey Federation (FIH)	Hockey governing body	Worldwide	The FIH, which governs field hockey, decided to exclude Russia from the 2022 Women's FIH Hockey Junior World Cup in South Africa.	3 March 2022	
International Chess Federation (FIDE)	Chess governing body	Worldwide	The FIDE banned Russian and Belarusian flags from international chess events, ended sponsorships with Russian and Belarusian sanctioned companies, and opened bids to other countries to host the 44th Chess Olympiad. Furthermore, it suspended Anatoly Karpov's title of FIDE Ambassador for Life.	3 March 2022	
International Go Federation (IGF)	Go tournament governing body	Worldwide	The IGF banned Russian and Belarusian players from competing under their flags in IGF hosted events, while urging its members to relocate or cancel their events currently planned in Russia or Belarus.	11 March 2022	
European Go Federation (EGF)	Go tournament governing body	Europe	The EGF suspended Russia's membership in the organization, cancelled or relocated events planned in Russia; and banned the display of Russian national symbols, flags or anthems in EGF organized events.	6 March 2022	
FC Schalke 04	Soccer team	Germany	FC Schalke 04 ended its sponsorship deal with Russian state-controlled oil and gas company Gazprom.	28 February 2022	
Euroleague Basketball	Basketball league	Europe	The Euroleague Basketball suspended participation of Russian teams CSKA Moscow, UNICS Kazan, and Zenit Saint Petersburg in the 2021–2022 EuroLeague and of Lokomotiv Kuban Krasnodar from the 2021–2022 EuroCup.	3 March 2022	
FIBA	Basketball governing body	Worldwide	FIBA, the international governing body for basketball, suspended participation of Russian national teams and officials in FIBA basketball and 3x3 basketball competitions until further notice. The Russian national team was expelled from the 2022 FIBA Women's Basketball World Cup. And FIBA Europe suspended Russian teams UMMC Ekaterinburg, Dynamo Kursk and MBA Moscow from the playoffs of EuroLeague Women and Russian team BC Avtodor from 2021–22 FIBA Europe Cup.	3 March 2022	
AusCycling	Cycling organization	Australia	AusCycling announced a ban on Russian or Belarusian teams at the 2022 UCI Road World Championships to be held in Australia in September.	1 March 2022	
International Ski Federation (FIS)	Ski sport governing body	Worldwide	The FIS cancelled all skiing events in Russia.	25 February 2022	
Norwegian Ski Federation (Skiing-Norway)	Ski sport governing body	Norway	the Norwegian Ski Federation told Russian athletes "we do not want your participation" in its upcoming events.	26 February 2022	
World Karate Federation	Karate governing body	Worldwide	The WKF relocated the 2022 Karate1 Premier League away from Moscow.	3 March 2022	
World Squash Federation	Squash governing body	Worldwide	The WSF relocated the 2022 World Junior Squash Championships away from Saint Petersburg.	25 February 2022	
European Handball Federation	Handball governing body	Europe	The EHF suspended participation of Russian and Belarusian national and club teams from its competitions.	5 March 2022	
Special Olympics	Non-profit organization	United States	The 2022 Special Olympics World Winter Games scheduled to take place in Kazan, Russia, were cancelled.	4 March 2022	
International University Sports Federation (FISU)	University sports governing body	Worldwide	The FISU withdrew three competitions from Russia and Belarus.	26 February 2022	
International Tennis Federation (ITF)	Tennis governing body	Worldwide	The ITF suspended the Russian Tennis Federation and Belarus Tennis Federation from ITF membership and participation in ITF international team competitions.	1 March 2022	
Association of Tennis Professionals (ATP) Women's Tennis Association (WTA)	Tennis governing body	Worldwide	Both the men's and women's tennis associations suspended tournaments in Russia and Belarus. While neither association has banned Russian and Belarusian players from participating in other tournaments, they are required to compete under a neutral flag. In country-focused events, such as the United Cup, Russian and Belarusian players were not allowed to participate.	1 March 2022	
International Sambo Federation (FIAS)	Sambo governing body	Worldwide	The FIAS suspended international sambo competitions in Russia and Belarus. Russian and Belarusian athletes may participate in FIAS international competitions under the FIAS flag, logo, and anthem.	3 March 2022	
International Federation of BodyBuilding and Fitness	Bodybuilding sport governing body	Worldwide	The IFBB bans all Russian and Belarusian athletes, but allows IFBB Elite Pro athletes to continue in participation of events.	9 March 2022	
Boston Athletic Association	Non-profit association	United States	The B.A.A. announced that all Russian and Belarusian athletes will be banned from the 2022 Boston Marathon and all other B.A.A. events.	6 April 2022	

Broadcasting rights

- The English Premier League announced that they will cancel its broadcast rights with Russian television network Match which supposed to be started in the 2022/23 season, its current broadcaster Okko Sport will end the rights to the league earlier.

=== Technology ===
Company	Industry	Country	Actions	Date	Ref.
Apple Inc.	Electronics	United States	Apple stopped selling products in Russia. This also includes the suspension of Apple Pay.	2 March 2022	
Oracle Corporation	Cloud computing	United States	Oracle suspended all operations in Russia.	2 March 2022	
SAP	Cloud computing	Germany	SAP paused sales in Russia.	2 March 2022	
Ericsson	Telecommunications	Sweden	Ericsson suspended all deliveries and operations in Russia.	3 March 2022 (deliveries), 11 April 2022 (operations)	
Snapchat	Social media platform	United States	Snapchat stopped running ads in Belarus, Russia and Ukraine and halts ad sales.	3 March 2022 (ad sales only)	
TikTok	Social media service	China	TikTok had restricted access to Russian state media accounts in the European Union.	28 February 2022	
Reddit	Social media platform	United States	Reddit prohibited links to Russian state media and rejected any advertisement from any Russian-based entity, government or private.	2 March 2022	
Namecheap	Domain registrar	United States	Domain registrar and hosting provider Namecheap terminated its service to all Russian customers, requiring users to switch providers by 22 March 2022. Namecheap allowed exceptions for "all anti-regime media, protest resources, and any type of websites that are helping to end this war and regime".	1 March 2022	
GoDaddy	Domain registrar	United States	GoDaddy stopped supporting new registrations for the .ru extension. Registrants are also unable to sell or transfer existing domains to any party for profit.	2 March 2022	
Uber	Transportation service	United States	Uber distanced itself from the Russian company Yandex.Taxi by ending its partnership agreement and three Uber executives resigned from its board. Uber agreed to allow Yandex to purchase its 29% stake in the company.	28 February 2022	
DuckDuckGo	Search engine	United States	DuckDuckGo paused its partnership with Yandex Search.	1 March 2022	
Rakuten	Conglomerate	Japan	Rakuten removed Russian ads from its messaging app Viber.	3 March 2022 (Viber ads only)	
Microsoft	Software maker	United States	Microsoft suspended new sales of its products and services on 4 March. Later it was announced that the company would donate the sales of Epic Games' Fortnite on Xbox One and Xbox Series X/S from March 20 to April 3 to humanitarian relief organizations working in Ukraine.	4 March 2022	
Cisco	Cloud computing	United States	Cisco suspended all deliveries to Russia and Belarus.	3 March 2022	
Samsung Electronics	Electronics	South Korea	Samsung suspended shipments to Russia and is donating $6 million to aid refugees and to other humanitarian relief efforts. Samsung Pay is also suspended in Russia.	4 March 2022	
LG Electronics	Electronics	South Korea	LG Electronics, a South Korean technology company, operates a TV and home electronics plant in Ruza, Russia, and has said that it has enough inventory of raw materials and components in Russia for the production of their products there. It announced on 19 March 2022 that it is suspending all shipments to Russia.	19 March 2022	
Panasonic	Electronics	Japan	Panasonic suspended shipments and ended operations, while donating ¥20 million in aid to Ukrainian refugees under the Polish Red Cross.	4 March 2022	
Meta	Social Media platform	United States	Meta's Facebook and Instagram, as well as Twitter, stopped displaying RT and Sputnik accounts in EU member states.	3 March 2022	
Twitter	Social Media platform	United States	Meta's Facebook and Instagram, as well as Twitter, stopped displaying RT and Sputnik accounts in EU member states.	3 March 2022	
Google	Search engine	United States	Google suspended its ad business on 4 March in response to the Russian government's ultimatum to "stop advertising anti-Russian propaganda". Then, on 11 March, YouTube said that its immediately blocking access around the world to channels associated with Russian state-funded media, citing a policy barring content that denies, minimizes or trivializes well-documented violent events. On 18 May 2022, Google Russia filed for bankruptcy, though the company will keep its free services, such as its search engine and YouTube, available in Russia.	4 March 2022 (ad business); 11 March 2022 (YouTube)	
Adobe Inc.	Software	United States	Adobe suspended new software service and newly subscription sales.	4 March 2022	
DJI	UAV	China	Paused the sales of its drones and issued a statement to condemn the use of its products that will cause harm.	26 April 2022	
Dell	Electronics	United States	Dell paused sales of all its PCs.	1 March 2022	
HP Inc.	Electronics	United States	HP suspends shipment of its products to Russia.	March 2022	
TSMC	Semiconductors	Taiwan	TSMC and GlobalFoundries halted sales to Russia and third parties that supplied to Russia. Russian companies that design their own chips such as Baikal CPU, MCST, Yadro and STC Module are manufactured by TSMC, which cut off Russia's access to semiconductors.	25 February 2022	
GlobalFoundries	Semiconductors	United States	TSMC and GlobalFoundries halted sales to Russia and third parties that supplied to Russia. Russian companies that design their own chips such as Baikal CPU, MCST, Yadro and STC Module are manufactured by TSMC, which cut off Russia's access to semiconductors.	25 February 2022	
Intel	Semiconductors	United States	Intel and AMD halted sales to Russia and third parties that supplied to Russia.	28 February 2022	
Advanced Micro Devices	Semiconductors	United States	Intel and AMD halted sales to Russia and third parties that supplied to Russia.	28 February 2022	
Yamaha Corporation	Audio equipment	Japan	Yamaha Corporation suspended exports and paused operations.	4 March 2022	
JCB	Heavy equipment	United Kingdom	JCB paused all operations, including the export of machines and spare parts.	3 March 2022	
KONE	Elevator and escalator manufacturer	Finland	KONE, ceased deliveries to Russia, and stopped signing new orders from Russia for the time being. The company made a donation for Ukraine through the Finnish Red Cross.	3 March 2022	
Nokia	Conglomerate	Finland	Nokia stopped deliveries to Russia and exited the market altogether soon afterwards.	1 March 2022 (deliveries), 12 April 2022 (operations)	
Web Summit	Conference event	Portugal	Web Summit banned all Russian government members, agencies, state-controlled media, state-backed businesses, and companies with ties to the Russian government from participating at its conferences.	4 March 2022	
Siemens	Industrial manufacturing	Germany	Siemens withdrew from most of its business in Russia.	March 2022	
Wärtsilä	Power sources	Finland	Wärtsilä, a Finnish company which manufactures and services power sources and other equipment in the marine and energy markets, has suspended all deliveries and new sales to Russia.	March 2022	
Ponsse	Forest machines	Finland	Ponsse, a Finnish company that manufactures, sells and maintains forest machine, discontinues temporarily all export operations to Russia and Belarus, including local spare parts and service operations.	7 March 2022	
Upwork	Freelancing platform	United States	Upwork is suspending all operations in Russia and Belarus, with a complete shut down to take effect by 1 May.	7 March 2022 (operations); 1 May 2022 (complete shut down)	
Clutch.co	Ratings and reviews platform	United States	Clutch.co, the leading ratings and reviews platform for IT, Marketing, and Business service providers, suspended all business activity in Russia and Belarus.	11 March 2022	
IBM	Conglomerate	United States	IBM suspended all business in Russia.	7 March 2022	
Cogent Communications	Internet backbone provider	United States	Cogent Communications disconnected all connections to Russia.	4 March 2022	
Lumen Technologies	Internet backbone provider	United States	Lumen Technologies disconnected all connections to Russia.	9 March 2022	
Alstom	Train maker	France	Alstom will suspend all deliveries towards Russia and all future business investments in Russia.	9 March 2022	
Ricoh	Printers	Japan	Ricoh, Canon, Epson, and Konica Minolta had suspended business in Russia.	March 2022	
Canon Inc.	Printers	Japan	Ricoh, Canon, Epson, and Konica Minolta had suspended business in Russia.	March 2022	
Epson	Printers	Japan	Ricoh, Canon, Epson, and Konica Minolta had suspended business in Russia.	March 2022	
Konica Minolta	Printers	Japan	Ricoh, Canon, Epson, and Konica Minolta had suspended business in Russia.	March 2022	
Amazon	Conglomerate	United States	Amazon ceased shipping of products in Russia and Belarus. They removed Amazon Prime Video access in Russia. They are not accepting customers based in Russia or Belarus for Amazon Web Services and Amazon third-party sellers.	9 March 2022	
Deere & Company	Heavy equipment	United States	Deere & Company had ended shipments to Russia and Belarus.	1 March 2022	
Caterpillar Inc.	Conglomerate	United States	Caterpillar, an American corporation that sells machinery, engines, generator sets and financial products, are suspending operations in their Russian manufacturing facilities.	March 2022	
Red Hat	Enterprise Linux provider	United States	Red Hat and SUSE suspended sales in Russia.	9 March 2022	
SUSE	Enterprise Linux provider	Germany	Red Hat and SUSE suspended sales in Russia.	9 March 2022	
Hitachi	Electronics	Japan	Hitachi is pausing exports to Russia and suspending all manufacturing in the country, with the exception of products, services and support for electrical power equipment.	2 March 2022	
General Electric	Conglomerate	United States	GE has suspended most of its operations in Russia, with the exception of providing essential medical equipment and supporting existing power services.	2 March 2022	
NetApp	Cloud computing	United States	NetApp suspended all operations in Russia.	10 March 2022	
Honeywell	Conglomerate	United States	Honeywell suspended business in both Russia and Belarus.	9 March 2022	
Autodesk	Software	United States	Autodesk suspended operations in Russia.	4 March 2022	
MongoDB Inc.	Software	United States	MongoDB, the NoSQL provider terminated accounts registered in Russia and Belarus.	15 March 2022	
Hostinger	Hosting provider	Lithuania	Hostinger suspended all payments from Russia and Belarus.	4 March 2022	
Teradata	Software	United States	Teradata, a software company that provides database and analytics-related software, products, and services stopped conducting business in Russia and has ceased customer interactions and services with all Russian accounts.	24 March 2022	
Telia Lietuva	Internet and Cable provider	Lithuania	Telia Lietuva, Cgates, and Splius stopped broadcasting Russian TV channels from their cable television services.	4 March 2022	
Cgates	Internet and Cable provider	Lithuania	Telia Lietuva, Cgates, and Splius stopped broadcasting Russian TV channels from their cable television services.	4 March 2022	
Splius	Internet and Cable provider	Lithuania	Telia Lietuva, Cgates, and Splius stopped broadcasting Russian TV channels from their cable television services.	4 March 2022	
Asus	Hardware manufacturer	Taiwan	Stopped exports to Russia.	14 March 2022	

=== Tourism and hospitality ===
Company	Industry	Country	Actions	Date	Ref.
Delta Air Lines	Airline	United States	Delta Air Lines suspended its code sharing partnership with Russian airliner Aeroflot.	25 February 2022	
Alaska Airlines	Airline	United States	Alaska Airlines suspended its mileage partnership with S7 Airlines, and interline relationships with Aeroflot and S7 Airlines.	1 March 2022	
AirBaltic	Airline	Latvia	AirBaltic, Latvia's flag carrier had suspended all flights to and from the Russian market.	5 March 2022	
Air Astana	Airline	Kazakhstan	Air Astana, Kazakhstan's flag carrier had suspended all flights to and from the Russian market.	11 March 2022	
Pegasus Airlines	Airline	Turkey	Pegasus Airlines, one of Turkey's commercial airlines, had suspended all flights to and from the Russian market. As of August 2023, Pegasus Airlines have resumed daily flights to Moscow and Saint Petersburg over European airspace into Russian airspace.	11 March 2022	
Wizz Air	Airline	Hungary	Wizz Air 'temporarily suspended' all flights from and to Russia.	1 March 2022	
Airbnb	Hospitality	United States	Airbnb suspended all operations in Russia and Belarus.	4 March 2022	
Booking Holdings	Travel website holding	United States	Booking Holdings, the operator of Priceline, Booking, Agoda, Kayak and Opentable, suspended all operations in Russia and travel services in Belarus.	4 March 2022	
GetYourGuide	Travel agency	Germany	GetYourGuide stopped offering experiences in Russia.	2 March 2022	
Hilton Worldwide	Hospitality	United States	Hilton, an American hospitality company with 29 locations in Russia, is suspending all new developmental activity in Russia and have closed their corporate office in Moscow.	9 March 2022	
Hyatt	Hospitality	United States	Hyatt, a hospitality company with 6 locations in Russia, is halting development in Russia and new investments, but it continues to evaluate hotel operations in Russia.	10 March 2022	
InterContinental Hotels Group	Hospitality	United Kingdom	InterContinental Hotels Group, a British hotel operator with 29 hotels in Russia, suspended its investments in Russia on 10 March 2022. However, they are still actively taking bookings and there is a new Crowne Plaza opening in Moscow in June. On 27 June, IHG suspended all operations in Russia.	10 March 2022 (investments only); 27 June 2022 (full operations)	
Marriott International	Hospitality	United States	Marriott, a hospitality company with 10 locations in Russia, has closed its corporate office in Moscow, and paused the opening of upcoming hotels and all future hotel development and investment in Russia. However, it says their hotels in Russia are owned by third parties and they continue to evaluate the ability for these hotels to remain open.	10 March 2022	
Expedia Group	Travel website holding	United States	Expedia Group, operator of trivago, Orbitz, Travelocity, Hotwire.com, Tripadvisor, and Hotels.com had ceased sales to and from Russia.	2 March 2022	
Rick Steves	Travel expert	United States	Rick Steves and his company Rick Steves Europe cancelled 2022 tours which include stops to Russia.	28 February 2022	
smarTours	Travel agency	United States	smarTours cancelled its Russia itineraries.	4 March 2022	
eDreams ODIGEO	Travel website	Spain	eDreams ODIGEO shuts down its Russian website on 28 February, with Russian and Belarusian airlines removed from its inventory. Later on 4 March, the company stopped offering hotel bookings in conjunction with Booking Holdings.	28 February 2022 (website); 4 March 2022 (Hotel bookings)	
G Adventures	Travel agency	Canada	G Adventures and its company founder Bruce Poon Tip announced that the tour operator has cancelled all tours in Russia and travellers booked on forward departures will be refunded.	2 March 2022	
Kensington Tours	Travel agency	Canada	Kensignton Tours is not accepting bookings for trips scheduled for Russia and Ukraine throughout 2022, and has decided to move these trips to future dates.	4 March 2022	
Tauck	Cruise ships	United States	Tauck announced that all 2022 departures of its Russian Glories, Baltic Treasures tour have been cancelled. That itinerary included Lithuania and Latvia, plus Finnish capital Helsinki and Russian cities St. Petersburg and Moscow. Also, Tauck has removed St. Petersburg as a call in its St. Petersburg & the Baltic Sea small-ship cruise itinerary.	4 March 2022	
The Travel Corporation	Travel agency	United States	The Travel Corporation, operator of Trafalgar Tours, said that it will not be operating Russia tours in 2022.	4 March 2022	

== Other ==
=== Airspace closures ===
Russia Ukraine – closed its airspace to Russia in 2015 Countries that have banned Russian aircraft from their airspace in response to the invasion

By 5 March 2022, the following countries and territories had completely closed their airspace to all Russian airlines and Russian-registered private jets:

- Albania
- Canada
- Iceland
- Kosovo
- Moldova
- Montenegro
- North Macedonia
- Norway
- Switzerland
- Ukraine (since 2015)
- United Kingdom
- United States

European Union (EU27)

- Austria
- Belgium
- Bulgaria
- Croatia
- Cyprus
- Czech Republic
- Denmark
- Estonia
- Finland
- France
- Germany
- Greece
- Hungary
- Ireland
- Italy
- Latvia
- Lithuania
- Luxembourg
- Malta
- Netherlands
- Poland
- Portugal
- Romania
- Slovakia
- Slovenia
- Spain
- Sweden

The European Union had already banned all Belarusian aircraft from EU airspace in June 2021 in response to the forced landing of Ryanair Flight 4978.

As well, airlines from many other countries have diverted their flights away from Russian airspace, despite not being banned by Russia or not slapping a ban on Russian aircraft. This includes:

- Australia
- Bangladesh
- Hong Kong (Except flights to/from New York, Boston or Toronto, but would be unable to divert to Russian airports)
- Japan
- South Korea
- Singapore (Singapore Airlines had already diverted their flights away from Belarus after Ryanair Flight 4978 incident)
- Taiwan

=== Breaking of diplomatic relations ===
Both Ukraine and the Federated States of Micronesia indefinitely severed all diplomatic ties with Russia.

== Controversy ==
=== Criticism ===
Critics of the boycott and sanctions have predicted that they would not cause significant changes in the Russian government's policy. Patrick Cockburn argued that sanctions similar to those used against Iraq will cause widespread poverty and claim more lives than the use of military force. Others have supported the cultural boycott but called for economic coercion to be narrowly targeted. Some critics noted that the decision of major credit card companies to suspend their operations in Russia will affect any Russian who has taken out a credit card in their home country, including those who have protested against the war in Ukraine, who are trying to flee Russia or are now living abroad.

Activists in Russia believe that amid lost access to financial and educational institutions, Putin will be better able to paint Western countries as the enemy. Carnegie Moscow Center scholar Andrey Movchan wrote that sanctions aimed at ordinary Russians could be "exactly what the Kremlin wants – that tens of millions of Russians who oppose the regime will be unable to leave the country and even temporarily find themselves in a world free of Russian propaganda", stating that sanctions should instead "uncompromisingly block the Kremlin's access to its financial and technological resources".

Cloudflare CEO Matthew Prince stated that "if Cloudflare were to stop operating in Russia, the Russian government would celebrate us shutting down" because "indiscriminately terminating service would do little to harm the Russian government, but would both limit access to information outside the country, and make significantly more vulnerable those who have used us to shield themselves as they have criticized the government".

Regarding the cultural boycott, Patrick West wrote that many parts had become a vehicle for Russophobia, notably an incident in which the University of Milano-Bicocca in Italy considered cancelling a course on Dostoyevski but ultimately did not. A decision by the Cardiff Philharmonic Orchestra to cancel a planned performance of Tchaikovsky's 1812 Overture was met with similar controversy. One of the directors stated that continuing with the original concert would have been offensive due to the themes of Russian military pride and not simply because Tchaikovsky was Russian. Discussing these issues, the communications coordinator for Diem25 expressed regret that Netflix was suspending its adaptation of Anna Karenina due to the involvement of a Russian production company. Business professor Stanislav Markus has suggested that boycotts of Russia might expand to include more countries as the companies involved become increasingly comfortable with deglobalisation.

=== Polling within Russia and Belarus ===
In April 2022, only 11% of Belarusians supported sending Belarusian troops to Ukraine. A study performed by Chatham House in May 2022 revealed that 32% of Belarusian respondents supported the Russian invasion of Ukraine and 40% did not support the invasion.

A Kremlin-associated poll claimed that the 68% of the Russian population approves of the "special military operation" in Ukraine, while independent polls put that number at 58%. The Kremlin-associated poll, which was conducted between February 28 and March 6, claimed that Putin's approval rating was 74.6%. According to the poll, in the group of 18-to-24-year-olds, only 29% of Russians supported the "special military operation" in Ukraine. Two reasons many Russians still support Putin and the "special military operation" in Ukraine have to do with the propaganda and disinformation being sown by the Kremlin, and the antagonization and discrimination by Western populations/institutions of Russian people. Some Russians publicly displayed the infamous "Z" letter. Russian gymnast Ivan Kuliak displayed it while standing on a victory podium near a Ukrainian athlete and later expressed no regret for doing that. More than 200,000 attended Vladimir Putin's pro-war nationalist rally at the Luzhniki Stadium on 18 March, with many forced by their employers to attend.

A series of four online polls of Moscow residents by Alexei Navalny's Anti-Corruption Foundation claimed that between February 25 and March 3, the share of respondents in Moscow who considered Russia an "aggressor" increased from 29% to 53%, while the share of those who considered Russia a "peacemaker" fell by half from 25% to 12%.

Some observers noted what they described as a "generational struggle" among Russians over perception of the war, with younger Russians generally opposed to the war and older Russians more likely to accept the narrative presented by state-controlled media in Russia, the main source of news for most Russians. Kataryna Wolczuk, an associate fellow of Chatham House's Russia and Eurasia programme, said that "[Older] Russians are inclined to think in line with the official 'narrative' that Russia is defending Russian speakers in Ukraine, so it's about offering protection rather than aggression." A poll by the independent Levada Center published on 30 March saw Putin's approval rating jump from 71% in February to 83% in March. However, many respondents do not want to answer pollsters' questions for fear of negative consequences. In March 2022, when a Russian politician Maxim Katz and a group of Russian researchers commissioned a poll on Russians’ attitudes toward the war in Ukraine, 29,400 of the 31,000 people they called refused to answer after hearing the theme of the question.

=== Companies criticised for not joining the boycott ===
A number of companies have faced growing pressure to halt operations in Russia, but have not yet done so. Those include:

- Accor, a French hospitality company with 55 locations in Russia
- AmerisourceBergen, an American healthcare company with research depots in Russia
- Arconic, an American industrial company
- Binance, one of world's largest crypto exchanges, which refused to ban all Russian accounts. However, Binance announced that it has donated more than $10 million to its Ukrainian Emergency Relief Fund and $2.5 million to UNICEF's efforts in Ukraine.
- Bosch, one of the largest German multinational engineering and technology companies headquartered in Gerlingen
- Bridgestone, a Japanese auto and truck parts manufacturer, left Russia after it sold all its interests in December 2023.
- Burger King, an American fast food chain
- Citigroup, an American bank
- COSCO, a Chinese container shipping company, and one of the largest container shipping companies in the world
- Credit Suisse, a global investment bank and financial services firm founded and based in Switzerland. Credit Suisse has declared that its Moscow offices remain open, as it was trying to shred evidence of $1.7 billion Russian loans backed by yachts.
- Deutsche Bank, a German multinational investment bank and financial services company headquartered in Frankfurt, Germany, and dual-listed on the FWB and the NYSE. According to The New Yorker, Deutsche Bank has long had an "abject" reputation among major banks, as it has been involved in major scandals across different issue areas.
- Ferragamo, an Italian luxury goods company, does not own stores in Russia and shipments to franchise operations ceased in March 2022.
- French retail companies owned wholly or partially by members of the Mulliez family:
  - Auchan, a supermarket chain which in 2016 was ranked first in a list of the largest foreign-owned companies by the Russian edition of Forbes, with revenue in Russia of more than $5 billion
  - Leroy Merlin, a home improvement and DIY retailer, operates 112 stores in Russia. On 11 March the company announced it had no plans to reduce its operations in Russia.
- Herbalife, an American marketing company
- International Paper, an American paper and pulp manufacturer
- Japan Tobacco International, the top tobacco company in Russia, which controls 37% of the Russian tobacco market
- Kia, a South Korean car manufacturer and Russia's third-largest carmaker as of 2016. Kia holds a 30% stake in the Hyundai Motor Manufacturing Rus plant in St. Petersburg which is being sold in December 2023. The contract includes a two-year buyback clause.
- Kimberly-Clark, an American personal care corporation
- Koch Industries, an American conglomerate
- Lenovo, a Chinese hardware and electronics manufacturer
- Metro AG, a German company which operates cash and carry stores in Russia
- Micro-Star International, a Taiwanese multinational information technology corporation
- Mohawk Industries, an American manufacturer
- Nokian Tyres, which produces 80% of its tyres in Russia and employs around 1,600 people. In October 2022, Nokian sold its Russian operations to Tatneft for €400 million and announced a €650 million investment for a new factory in Romania.
- Otis Worldwide, an American elevator and escalator manufacturer. It announced on 11 March that is suspending new sales of its elevators and escalators in Russia while continuing all existing maintenance deals.
- Pirelli, an Italian tyre manufacturer
- Renault, a French automobile company
- Timken, an American industrial company
- Whirlpool, American manufacturer and marketer of home appliances

== See also ==
- Corporate responses to the 2022 Russian invasion of Ukraine
- List of companies that applied sanctions during the Russo-Ukrainian War
- List of people and organizations sanctioned during the Russo-Ukrainian War
- International sanctions during the 2022 Russian invasion of Ukraine
- International Sponsors of War
- Disinvestment from Israel
- Disinvestment from South Africa
- "Do not buy Russian goods!"
  - Boycott Russian Films
