= MV Explorer (1969) =

Antarctic Ocean cruise ship sunk in 2007

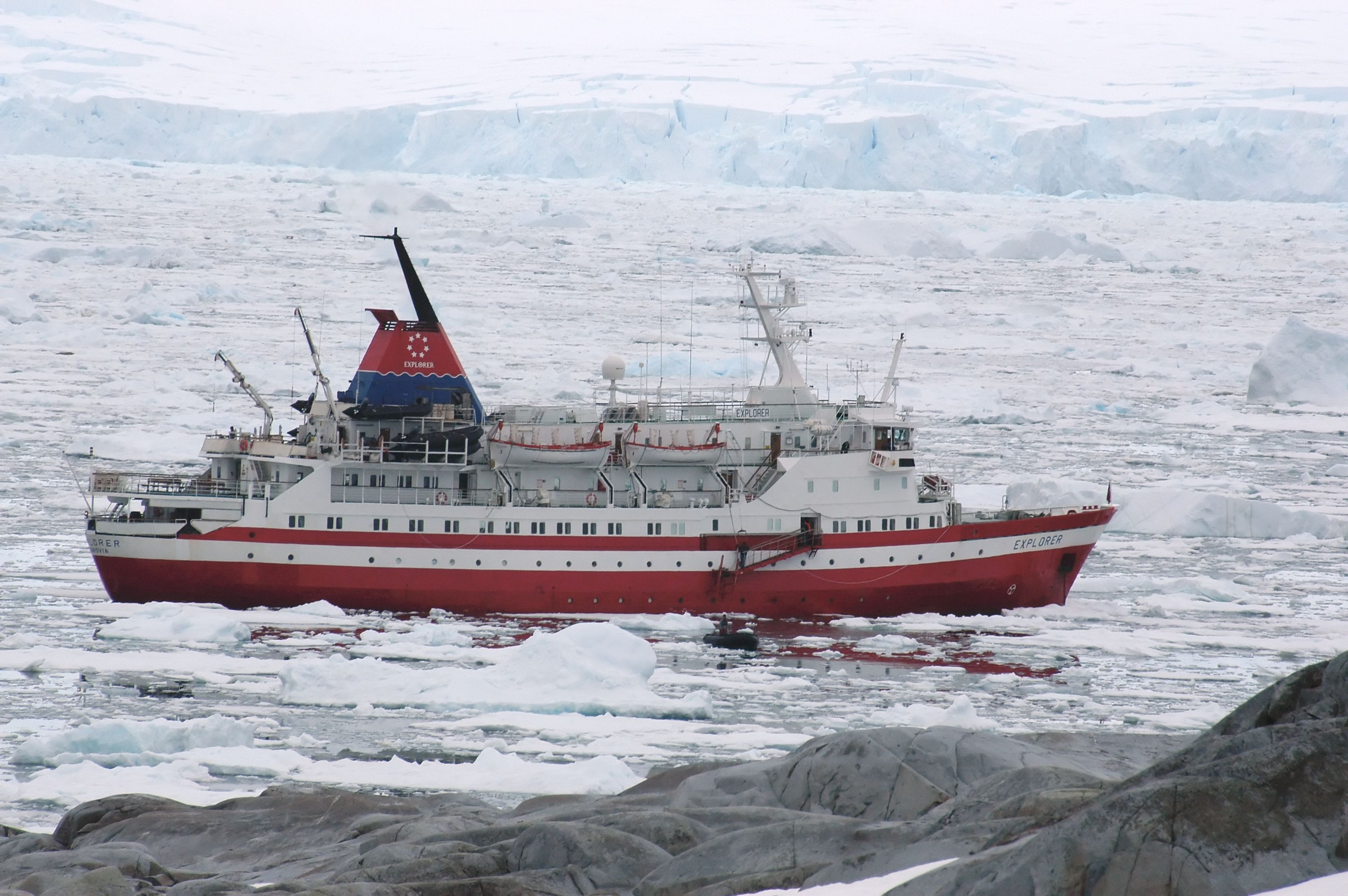
- MS Explorer in January 2005

History
- Name: 1969–1985: Lindblad Explorer; 1985–1992: Society Explorer; 1992–2007: Explorer
- Owner: 1969–1972: K/S A/S Explorer; 1972–1980: Swedish American Line; 1980–1982: Lindblad Swire Cruises; 1982–1983: Salén; 1983–1985: Ferry Services Curacao; 1985–1992: Discoverer Reederei; 1992–2003: Explorer Shipping; 2003–2004: Kyris Shipping; 2004–2007: Gap Adventures
- Port of registry: (Norway) Oslo (1969–72); Panama City (1972–89); (Liberia) Monrovia (1989–2007)
- Builder: Uudenkaupungin Telakka, Uusikaupunki, Finland
- Yard number: 260
- Laid down: 1969
- Launched: 18 June 1969
- In service: 14 December 1969
- Out of service: 23 November 2007
- Identification: IMO number: 6924959; Liberian Official Number 8495
- Fate: Sank after hitting an iceberg on 23 November 2007 at 62°24′S 57°16′W

General characteristics
- Tonnage: 2398
- Length: 239 ft (73 m)
- Beam: 46 ft (14 m)
- Draught: 14 ft 7 in (4.45 m)
- Ice class: ICE-1A (as per BNV, equals Finnish-Swedish IA)
- Propulsion: Main: 2 × MaK diesel M452 AK each 1,800 bhp (1,300 kW), driving a single variable-pitch propeller, 4 blades; Auxiliary: 3 × MWM TBD 604 L6, 290 kW Alternators: Type: 3 × generators Still DK 559 D-4 325 kVA. 1 × MWM emergency diesel AD 323 V6. 1 × emergency generator Still DK 367-4/43 + KO 02/325 80 kVA. All generators 3 phase 440 V. 350 hp (260 kW) bow thruster.
- Speed: 12.5 knots (23.2 km/h; 14.4 mph)
- Capacity: 104 passengers
- Crew: 54

MS Explorer or MV Explorer was a Liberian-registered cruise ship, used for Antarctic cruising. She was the first cruise ship to sink there, after impact with the Antarctic pack ice on 23 November 2007. All passengers and crew were rescued.

The ship was commissioned and operated by the Swedish explorer Lars-Eric Lindblad. Its 1969 expeditionary cruise to Antarctica was the forerunner for today's sea-based tourism in that region. The vessel was originally named MS Lindblad Explorer (until 1985), and MS Society Explorer (until 1992). Ownership of the vessel changed several times, the last owner being the Toronto-based travel company Gap Adventures which acquired Explorer in 2004.

Explorer was abandoned in the early hours of 23 November 2007 after taking on water near the South Shetland Islands in the Southern Ocean, an area which is usually stormy but was calm at the time. Explorer was stated by the Chilean Navy to have sunk at an approximate position of 62°24′S 57°16′W, between the South Shetlands and Grahams Land in the Bransfield Strait; where the depth is roughly 600 metres (2,000 ft). The Royal Navy Antarctic Patrol Ship Endurance, whilst carrying out a hydrographic survey for the British Antarctic Survey and at the request of the Foreign and Commonwealth Office, later pinpointed Explorer's final resting place as 62°24′18″S 57°11′46″W, at an approximate depth of 1,130 metres (3,710 ft) – a distance of 4,373 m (14,350 ft) from her reported sinking position. This is broadly consistent with the direction of the prevailing current.

== History ==
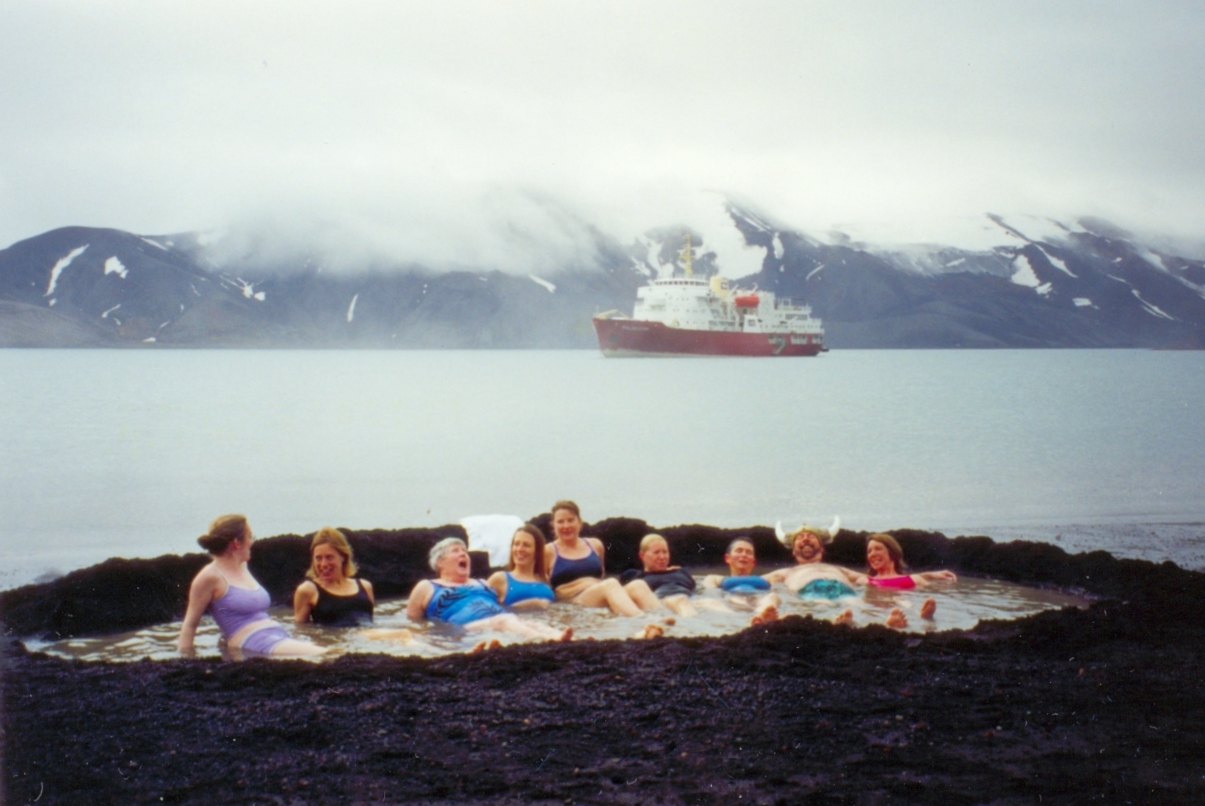
Tourists at Deception Island (2006)

Explorer was commissioned by Lars-Eric Lindblad, the Swedish-American pioneer of "exotic expedition" tours, and built in 1969 at Uudenkaupungin Telakka, a shipyard in Uusikaupunki, Finland. The ship was built to stay afloat with two compartments filled with water. Her original Finnish-Swedish ice class was 1C, which is relatively weak. It is not known when the ice class was uprated to 1A. The vessel was originally named Lindblad Explorer, after Lars-Eric Lindblad, and was the first custom-built expeditionary cruise ship.

The first notable incident of the Explorer was when it ran aground near La Plaza Point, Antarctica, on 11 February 1972; her passengers, Lindblad among them, were rescued by the Chilean Navy. She was towed to Buenos Aires, Argentina, and then to Kristiansand, Norway, for repairs. After being renamed the Lindblad Explorer, the ship ran aground off Wiencke Island in the Antarctic on 25 December 1979. The 70 passengers and 34 of the crew were rescued by the Chilean Navy Antarctic transport Piloto Pardo, leaving the captain and a skeleton crew of 21 on board to await the arrival of a tugboat.

Explorer was the first cruise ship to navigate the Northwest Passage in 1984. She was involved in the rescue of the crew of an Argentine supply ship in 1989 that had hit a rock ledge off Anvers Island, Antarctica. In 1998 Explorer was the first ship to circumnavigate James Ross Island; and in the same year, was claimed to be the first ship, as distinct from river boat, to sail 80 miles (130 km) above Iquitos, Peru, to the point where the Marañón and Ucayali rivers meet to become the Amazon River.

Explorer was depicted on at least two postage stamps issued by South Georgia, and one issued by the Falkland Islands. Explorer was nicknamed "the Little Red Ship". A scale model of Explorer is on display at Canterbury Museum, Christchurch, New Zealand.

== Sinking ==
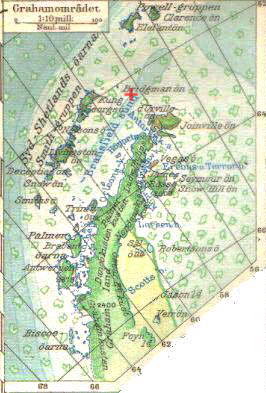
Map showing location of sinking

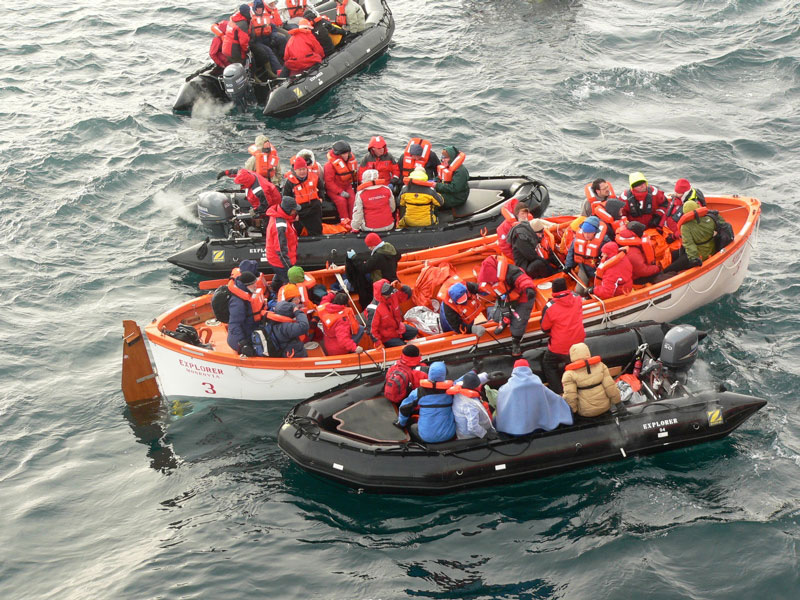
Passengers escape the sinking Explorer

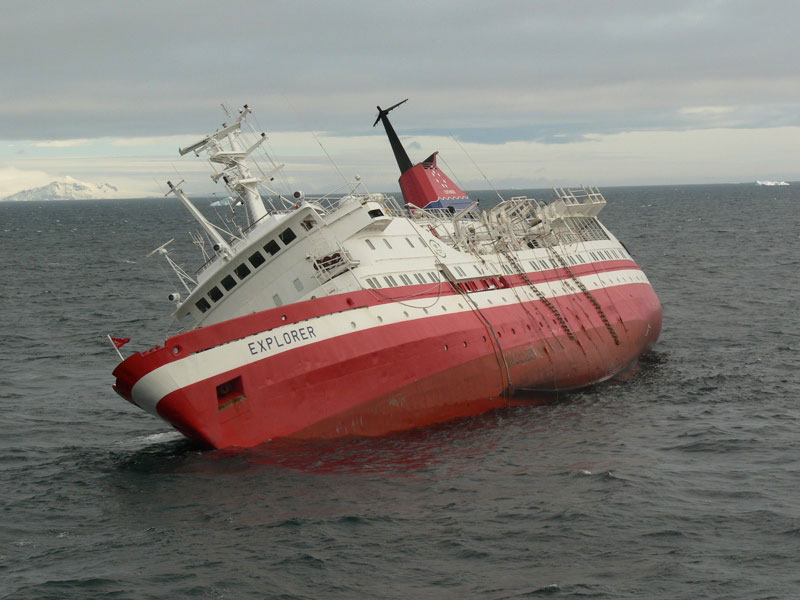
Explorer listing severely on 23 November 2007

Explorer departed from Ushuaia, Argentina, on 11 November 2007 on a 19-day cruise called Spirit of Shackleton run by Gap Adventures, intended to trace the route of the 20th-century explorer Ernest Shackleton through the Drake Passage (an area typically stormy with rough seas). After visiting the Falkland Islands and South Georgia, she hit an iceberg on 23 November 2007 in the Bransfield Strait, close to King George Island in the Southern Ocean and near the South Shetland Islands. The iceberg struck by Explorer made a gash in the hull which allowed water to enter.

The Argentine Navy later said in a statement that it had observed "significant" damage. The official report of the sinking noted: "The damage sustained had to have extended along the length of the vessel from Cabins 308 to 314 for at least a distance of 3.6 meters, and, in all likelihood, had punctured and sliced holes along the shell plating."

Some passengers on Explorer reported a loud "bang" at the time of impact, although others reported that there had been no noticeable impact, or at least nothing more than the normal crunching of ice experienced when sailing through icy waters. One passenger reported sea water in their cabin at about 03:00 UTC. Some reports also indicated that the ship had drifted into an iceberg on Explorer's starboard side while the crew was assessing damage caused by the original impact, also to the starboard side of the ship.

A mayday call was put out by the ship at 04:24 UTC, and rescue operations were quickly coordinated by the DPA Peter Burman in Sweden who made contact with the Prefectura Naval Argentina (the Argentinian equivalent of a coastguard) and the Chilean Navy Center for Search and Rescue. Chile dispatched the icebreaker Almirante Óscar Viel as well as nearby commercial ships, including the MN Ushuaia, the National Geographic Endeavour, and the Norwegian Coastal Express ship MS Nordnorge which was operating as a passenger cruise ship at the time. By 07:30 UTC all 91 passengers, nine guides and 54 crew, (Note: The crew of 54 was made up largely of Filipinos, 45 of whom were aboard) from over 14 countries, (Note: G.A.P. Adventures listed: 24 Britons, 17 Dutch, 14 Americans, 12 Canadians and 10 Australians, four Swedes, four Irish, three Danes, two Argentines, two Belgians, two Chinese (Hong Kong), and single passengers from China, France, Germany, Japan, Colombia, Sweden. Not clarified, are earlier reports of 2 New Zealanders, 2 Bulgarians, and 1 Pole.) had taken to the Explorer's lifeboats. They drifted for five hours until they were picked up by the Norwegian ship MS Nordnorge, which arrived on scene at approximately 10:00 UTC.

All of those rescued by Nordnorge were taken to the Chilean Frei Montalva Station on King George Island, from where they were subsequently airlifted by C-130 Hercules transport aircraft of the Chilean Air Force to Punta Arenas, Chile, in two separate flights; one on Saturday 24 November and the other on Sunday 25 November. Those passengers not taken to Punta Arenas (an estimated 70) were taken to Uruguay's Artigas Base. Explorer sank at 19:00 UTC, approximately 20 hours after the initial impact and damage to her hull. Her wreck lies at 62°24′18″S 57°11′46″W.

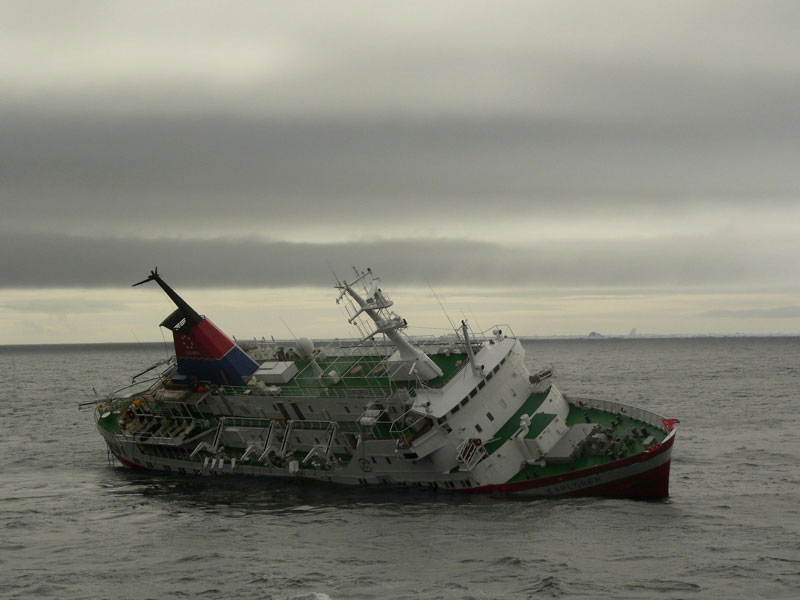
Explorer sinking

Explorer was designed, like most ships, with compartments which could be sealed off by watertight doors. The ship would not sink if holed and one compartment flooded, but was not safe if more compartments were flooded, either by a gash spanning compartments or imperfect sealing between compartments. Gap Adventures reported that there was a crack in addition to the hole, but it is not clear if it spanned compartments.

In an article published on 8 December 2007, Jim Barnes, the executive director of the Antarctic and Southern Ocean Coalition said that Explorer was "perfect for ice navigation", and stated that the explanation of the sinking "doesn't add up" and that "essential pieces of the story are missing". Sander Calisal, professor emeritus of naval architecture at the University of British Columbia, added that Explorer's ice-reinforced hull ought to have withstood accidental contact with submerged ice.

== Investigation ==
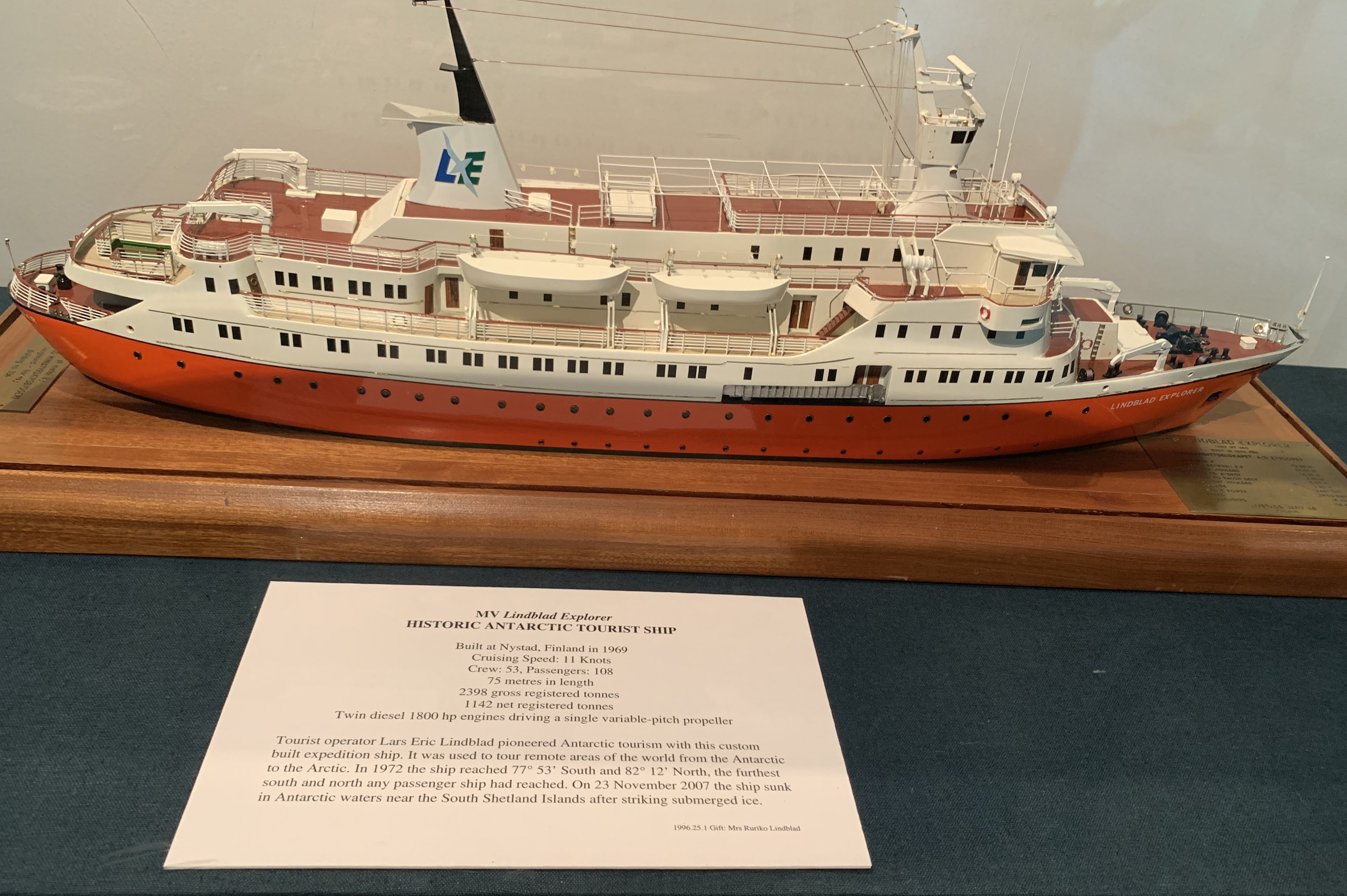
Side view of scale model of Lindblad Explorer on display at Canterbury Museum, Christchurch, New Zealand.

The investigation into the sinking of Explorer was carried out by the Liberian Bureau of Maritime Affairs. The report into the accident was released in April 2009.

The report listed the cause of the accident as the decision by Captain Bengt Wiman, age 49, to enter the ice field, stating that, "He was under the mistaken impression that he was encountering first year ice, which in fact, as the Chilean Navy Report indicated, was much harder land ice."

The report adds that passengers reported seeing red paint on the passing ice less than thirty minutes prior to when the flooding was reported, another indication that the vessel was passing through compact and hard ice. The report said that while Wiman was very experienced in Baltic waters, he was unfamiliar with the type of ice he encountered in Antarctic waters. The report's investigating officer could not convince Gap Adventures that it was their responsibility to retrieve the ship's voyage data recorder, after the master failed to ensure its transfer from the ship despite being reminded to do so. The report also found that, given that the Gap Adventures staff "served the function of crew members", they should have had "the required safety training and documents as seafarers".

The report praised the performance of Wiman and crew in organizing and evacuating the passengers, and notes that lives were likely saved due to their actions.
