= G Adventures =

Small-group travel company based in Toronto, Canada

- Formerly: Gap Adventures
- Type: Tour operator
- Industry: Tourism
- Founded: 1990; 36 years ago
- Founder: Bruce Poon Tip
- Headquarters: Toronto, Ontario, Canada
- Products: Escorted tours
- Number of employees: 400+
- Website: gadventures.com

G Adventures is an operator of small-group escorted tours. It is based in Toronto, Ontario, Canada with 28 offices worldwide.

The company has a focus on travel and partners with the National Geographic Society, creating a program of 80 tours called National Geographic Journeys with G Adventures.

== History ==
The company was co-founded as Gap Adventures in 1990 by Anita Voth and Bruce Poon Tip who met while working at the Toronto office of Australian tour operator, Worldwide Adventures. The letters in the name Gap Adventures stood for "Great Adventure People" and "bridging the gap" between backpacking and other types of travel, respectively.

In February 1991, the company operated its first tour - an excursion to Ecuador with 6 participants.

The ship MV Explorer sank in the Bransfield Strait on a 19-day Antarctic cruise called the Spirit of Shackleton, run by the company, then known as Gap Adventures. The ship sank after hitting an iceberg on the 13th of November; all 154 passengers and crew members were rescued and no injuries were reported.

In 2008, the company was sued by Gap Inc. for use of the "Gap" name. In 2011, the company was required to change its name by the United States District Court for the Southern District of New York, which deemed the name was an infringement on the clothing brand and caused legitimate confusion and dilution. The company then changed its name to G Adventures.

In January 2017, the company acquired British travel brands Travelsphere and Just You, based in Market Harborough.

In June 2019, the company opened a headquarters in Boston.

In March 2020, the company started a severe retrenchment process due to the recent outbreak of the Coronavirus disease with many of its employees being impacted.

== Awards ==
In 2018, the company was recognized as one of the World's Most Innovative Companies by Fast Company and was honoured at the Edison Awards for Social Impact.

== Partnerships ==
In 2011, G Adventures partnered with Global Exploration for Educators Organization (GEEO) with the goal of helping more teachers explore the world and then bring their experiences back into their classrooms. Since then, over 7,000 teachers have traveled through the program.

In 2013, G Adventures entered into a $1.3 million partnership with the Multilateral Investment Fund, a member of the Inter-American Development Bank, the largest source of development funding for Latin America and the Caribbean.

In 2015, G Adventures announced a partnership with the National Geographic Society to create the National Geographic Journeys with G Adventures tour.

In 2016, on World Tourism Day, G Adventures announced a partnership with the Jane Goodall Institute. The Jane Goodall Collection by G Adventures is a program of 20 itineraries aimed at raising the awareness of animal welfare and wildlife-friendly tourism, endorsed by primatologist Dr. Jane Goodall.
