= Bruce Poon Tip =

Canadian businessman

Bruce Poon Tip OC
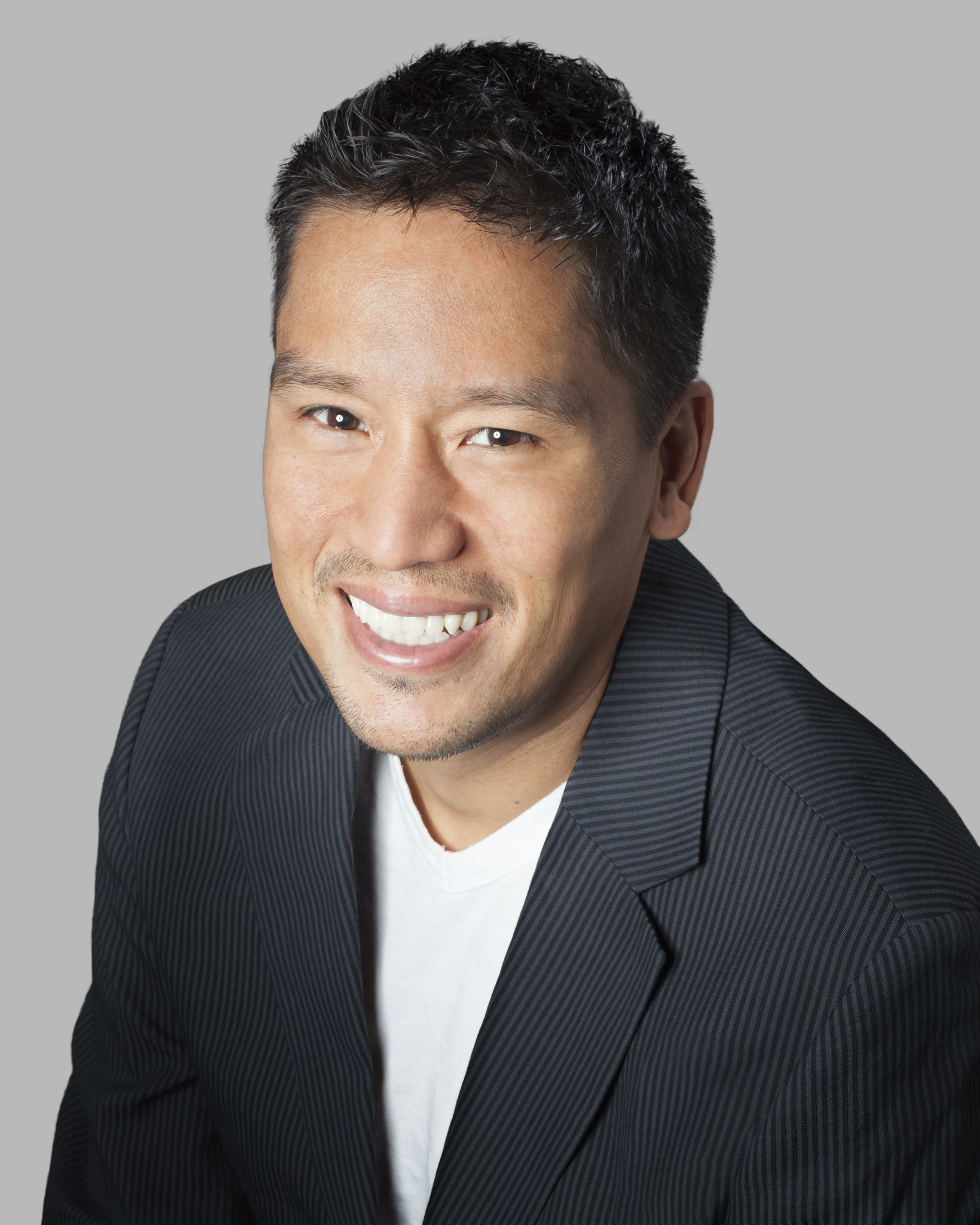
- Born: Port of Spain, Trinidad
- Education: CDI College, Calgary, Alberta
- Occupation: Founder of G Adventures

Bruce Poon Tip OC is a Canadian businessman and the founder of G Adventures, an adventure-travel company. He is an author of the book Looptail: How One Company Changed the World by Reinventing Business.

== Early life and education ==
Bruce Poon Tip was born in Port of Spain, Trinidad to a Chinese father and a Chinese-Venezuelan Spanish mother. He moved to Calgary, Alberta with his family when he was 6. At the age of 12, he subcontracted his newspaper routes to younger neighborhood kids. When he was 14, Poon Tip won his first award for business from Junior Achievement for selling 10,000 "Weather Worm" bookmarks on the counters of drug stores in Calgary, Alberta.

Poon Tip studied business at Mount Royal University in Calgary but transferred to study Tourism in Tourism College, which is now CDI College in Calgary, Alberta. On June 3, 2019, Bruce was granted an honorary Doctor of Laws from Capilano University to recognize his community contributions on the local, national and international level.

== Career ==
=== G Adventures ===
In 1990, Bruce Poon Tip cofounded G.A.P Adventures (later renamed G Adventures) with Anita Voth whom he met while working at Australian tour operator, Worldwide Adventures. Poon Tip recognized that there was a gap in the tourism industry for those seeking grassroots travel experiences, such as an alternative to resorts and cruise ships. His belief was that if travel was done correctly it could connect global cultures and lead to greater global wealth distribution. Unable to secure a loan from a financial institution to start the business, Poon Tip maxed out two credit cards to provide seed money to fund the first trips for the company.

One of the first trips that G Adventures offered was a local home stay with an Amazonian tribesman named Delfin and his family in the Amazon jungle in Ecuador. This partnership of embracing local cultures and travelers directly benefitting local communities was a cornerstone for Poon Tip's vision of travel. To this day, the trip remains a part of G Adventures offerings.

Over the next two decades, Poon Tip led G Adventures to 40% sales growth each year, including during the global recession of 2008, when Poon Tip turned down an offer of $100 million to sell G Adventures. It was at this time that Poon Tip realized the potential for G Adventures to grow beyond being a company that simply offered trips, but one that had a primary emphasis on organizational culture with a set of core values and a business model rooted in freedom and happiness that transcended the travel industry and was easily relatable to customers and employees alike.

Under Poon Tip's leadership, G Adventures has been named by National Geographic Adventures Magazine as a best 'Do It All Outfitter' on Earth and is a six-time recipient of the Top 10 Employers for Young People, a lifetime platinum recipient of the 50 Best Managed Companies and for ten consecutive years was named as one of Canada's fastest growing companies by Profit (magazine). G Adventures also received multiple Best Workplace Awards, as a result of employee surveys conducted by the Great Place to Work Institute.

Poon Tip is an authority on social entrepreneurship, 'quintuple bottom line' versus 3BL, corporate social & environmental responsibility, leading with service and innovation.

=== Planeterra Foundation ===
In 2003, Poon Tip founded Planeterra, a NGO that helps local people develop their communities, conserve their environment, and provide social solutions to local business challenges. Select Planeterra projects include a woman's weaving co-op in Peru Hope Africa, a day school for HIV/AIDS orphaned children in South Africa and New Hope Cambodia Vocational Training Restaurant in Cambodia, which provides marginalized people in that community with hospitality skills to help them obtain new dignified job opportunities.

In 2013, Planeterra announced a $1 million partnership with the Multilateral Investment Fund and the Inter-American Development Bank to fund five community-based tourism programs in Central and South America, which was a first for the tourism industry.

=== Speaking engagements ===
Poon Tip has spoken on sustainability and tourism at the 2010 TED (conference) Whistler, TED Bangkok and TEDx Toronto events, and spoke at the International Business Leaders' Forum at the inaugural United Nations World Tourism Organization Seminar on Ethics in Tourism. He has also presented at the UNWTO Conference on Climate Change and Tourism in Switzerland, the Ecotourism and Sustainable Tourism Conference in the USA and addressed the UN World Tourism Forum for Peace and Sustainable Development. At the request of the World Bank and UNESCO, Poon Tip was asked to lecture in China on Sustainable Development and has also presented at the United Nations launch of The Year of Eco Tourism in New York City.

=== Looptail: How One Company Changed The World by Reinventing Business ===
On September 17, 2013, Poon Tip released his first book, Looptail: How One Company Changed the World by Reinventing Business a major book release from HarperCollins Canada and Business Plus.. Looptail tells the story of how Poon Tip built G Adventures into a socially responsible business and evolved it into a social enterprise.

Looptail is the first business book to be endorsed by the 14th Dalai Lama, who wrote the foreword for the book and praised Poon Tip for being "one of those entrepreneurs who understand that human dignity, freedom, and genuine well-being are more important than the mere accumulation of wealth". The book debuted at #1 on the Globe and Mail hardcover non-fiction bestsellers list and at #4 on the New York Times How-to/advice list.

== Awards and achievements ==
Bruce has received many awards for business and workplace leadership and entrepreneurism over the years. Select achievements include:

- 2023 Officer of the Order of Canada
- 2020 Top 25 Canadian Immigrant Award Winner
- 2018 Joined AFAR magazine's Travel Vanguard which honours visionaries who have made a difference in the world
- 2018 Inducted into the British Travel and Hospitality Hall of Fame
- 2016 Named EY Entrepreneur of the Year
- 2013 Awarded a Queen Elizabeth II Diamond Jubilee Medal, recognizing achievements of noteworthy Canadians, awarded on behalf of Junior Achievement Canada.
- 2012 Inducted into the 2012 Social Venture Network Hall of Fame
- 2012 Appointed as a member to the United Nations Women in Canada National Committee Advisory Board
- 2011 Awarded Entrepreneurial Trailblazer Award from the Canadian Youth Business Foundation
- 2007 Recognized as the Chinese Canadian Entrepreneur of the Year by The Association of Chinese Canadian Entrepreneurs
- 2002, 2006 - Two-time recipient of Ernst & Young's Entrepreneur of the Year Award
- 1998 named as one of Canada's Top 40 Under 40
