= Geoff Allen (businessman) =

Australian businessman and academic

Geoff Allen AM
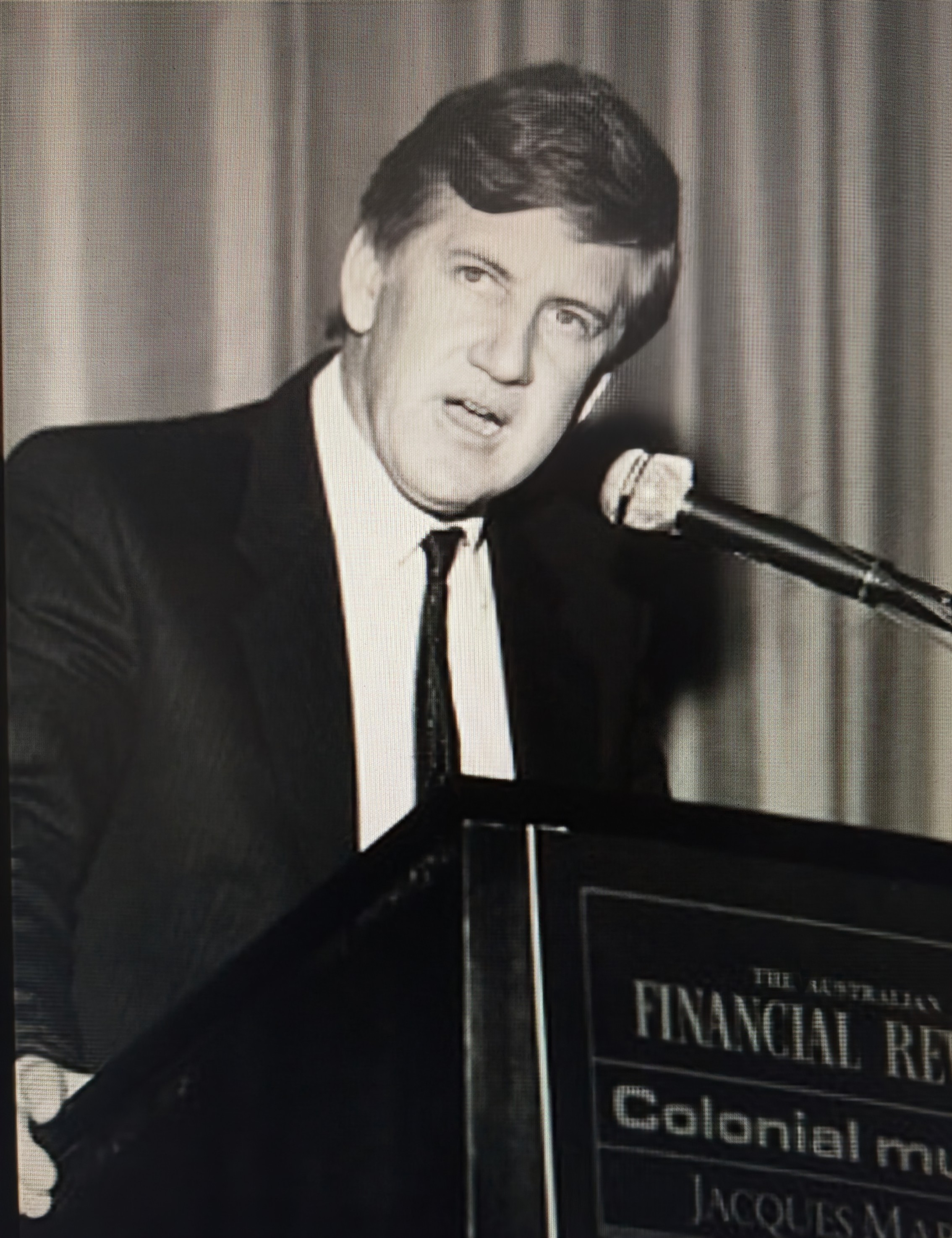
- Born: 9 December 1941 (age 84); Hopetoun, Victoria
- Education: Bachelor of Arts (Hons) History Master of Business Administration, The University of Melbourne
- Occupations: Business Executive, Company Director, Public Servant, Lecturer, Academic
- Organisation(s): Business Council of Australia, Committee for Economic Development of Australia, Centre for Corporate Public Affairs
- Awards: Member of the Order of Australia, Centenary Medal for contribution to Australian Trade Policy, Melbourne Business School, Distinguished Alumni Award

Geoffrey David Allen (born 9 December 1941) is an Australian businessman and recipient of the Order of Australia recognised for his contributions to business-government relations and corporate public affairs. He began his career in the Australian Public Service as a senior advisor to the Commonwealth Treasurer and Leader of the Opposition, Billy Snedden. Transitioning to academia, Allen was appointed Senior Research Fellow at the Graduate School of Management, a predecessor of the Melbourne Business School (MBS). As an adjunct professor, he taught MBA and executive programs for over three decades and served as Deputy Chairman of MBS.

Allen was the co-founder and inaugural CEO of the Business Council of Australia (BCA), leading it for five years during the transformative Hawke Government period of the 1980s. He later founded the Allen Consulting Group, serving as its chairman and advising companies and government agencies. Currently, Allen chairs the Centre for Corporate Public Affairs, a professional body with the membership of more than 100 corporate affairs departments of companies and government enterprises.

Previously, Allen chaired Commonwealth trade advisory councils (1989–2007) under the Hawke, Keating, and Howard governments, including the Trade Negotiations Advisory Group, Trade Policy Advisory Council, and its successor, the Trade Advisory Council. He also served as Chairman of the Australian Statistics Advisory Council, the Committee for Economic Development of Australia, and was the director of three public companies, Pasminco, Ausdoc, and Southern Cross Broadcasting.

== Early life ==
Allen was born in the small Victorian town of Hopetoun in 1941. He is the youngest of three children born to Edna and Reverend Donald Allen, a Methodist minister.

=== Education ===
Allen attended Yarra Park Primary School and, in 1956, enrolled at Wesley College, where he completed his secondary school education. After a gap year, Allen enrolled in a four-year arts degree at the University of Melbourne studying History and Philosophy. At University Allen was elected to the Students' Representative Council (SRC) and became its Vice-President. In 1967, Allen enrolled in the newly established MBA program at the University of Melbourne and received his Master's degree in 1969.

== Career ==
After finishing his undergraduate degree, Allen joined the Commonwealth Public Service where he developed an interest in federal politics and public administration. During this time, Allen enrolled in an MBA program at the University of Melbourne. Following the completion of his Master's degree, Allen transitioned into the political sphere. He served as private secretary and chief of staff for Billy Snedden, Minister for Labour and National Service, and subsequently Federal Treasurer. In December 1972, after Gough Whitlam's Labor Party won the federal election, Allen was appointed senior advisor to Snedden, who became Leader of the Opposition.

In 1973, Allen left Snedden's office quitting federal politics after four years. In 1974, he joined the faculty of the Melbourne Graduate School of Business Administration (now Melbourne Business School) as senior research fellow, where he conducted research, taught, and wrote academic papers about policy, public policy, and business-government interaction. William Byrt, a colleague at the school, noted "Geoff Allen pioneered the study of business-government relationships at the Graduate School of Business Administration. I believe he initiated that in Australia. His example has been followed in a number of educational institutions".

In 1978, Allen resigned as senior research fellow, and continued teaching MBA subjects as an adjunct professor for more than two decades. The same year, Allen was approached to join the Australian Industries Development Association (AIDA), an organisation of CEO's of Australia's largest manufacturing companies, where he led the association as Executive Director. Drawing on his experience at AIDA, Allen was invited to participate in the GATT Ministerial Meeting in Geneva in 1982 where he attended as a member of the Australian delegation.

Between 1980 and 1983, Allen was involved in merger dialogue between the AIDA, and in 1983 they formed the Business Council of Australia (BCA) in response to the "increasing challenges facing businesses and the perceived shortcomings of existing representative structures". During the formation of the BCA, Allen designed the framework for its objectives and modus operandi, he also served as the inaugural CEO of the council. During his five-year tenure as CEO, and subsequently, he was at the forefront of the economic reforms that spanned the Hawke Government era of the 1980s.

After stepping down from the BCA, Allen established the Allen Consulting Group in 1988. "In March 1989 he was joined at Allen Consulting by Dr Vince FitzGerald, previously Secretary of the Australian Government’s Department of Employment Education and Training and Secretary of the Department of Trade". Inspired by the US-based Public Affairs Council, Allen founded the Centre for Corporate Public Affairs, an independent business unit of ACIL Allen. The 'Centre' was launched in 1990 by Sir Arvi Parbo and addressed the growing need for professional development and networking opportunities in the field of corporate affairs. The Centre has members spanning from corporations, industry associations, and government business enterprises. Allen remains Chairman of the company.

After the State Electricity Commission of Victoria was partially privatised and separated into three operating companies in 1993, Allen was appointed Chair of the 'Government Steering Committee' which was tasked with facilitating the reform process.

In 1999, Allen accepted the role as Chairman of Australia's peak trade advisory body, the Trade Policy Advisory Council (TPAC) after being invited by Trade Minister Tim Fischer. In his capacity as Chair of TPAC, Allen joined the Australian delegation to the WTO Ministerial Conference in Seattle in November that year.

In 2006, Allen became Chairman of the Australian Statistics Advisory Council a commonwealth and state body that oversees the co-ordination and dissemination of official statistics, Allen held the position for a decade.

In 2007, Allen accepted an invitation by Trade Minister Warren Truss to chair Trade Advisory Council, which replaced the Trade Policy Advisory Council, the WTO Advisory Group, and the FTA Export Advisory Panel.

In 2008, Allen was appointed Chairman of the Committee for Economic Development of Australia (CEDA) where he was tasked with "strengthening organisations finances, governance and improving the quality of its leadership". He was awarded "honorary life membership of CEDA in recognition of his contribution".

== Publications ==
=== Books ===
- Allen, Geoff. On the Record. Real Film & Publishing, 2018. ISBN 9780648405696
- Allen, Geoff. Tales of Your Ancestors. Real Film & Publishing, 2022. ISBN 9780645213157
- Allen, Geoff. Business, Government & Society: Managing Corporate Public Affairs. Real Film & Publishing, 2025. ISBN 9780645681192

=== Journal Articles ===
- Allen, Geoff. "An Integrated Model: The Evolution of Public Affairs Down Under." The Handbook of Public Affairs. Edited by Phil Harris and Craig S. Fleisher, SAGE Publications Ltd: London; 2005, pp. 338–60. Sage Knowledge, doi: https://doi.org/10.4135/9781848608108.
- Allen, Geoff. “Public Affairs: New Wave of Research, The Handbook of Public Affairs." Edited by Phil Harris and Craig S. Fleisher, SAGE Publications Ltd: London; 2006, pp. 309–316. Sage Knowledge, doi: https://doi.org/10.1002/pa.223.
- Allen, Geoff. “CSR: Corporate Sainthood or Pragmatic Business Strategy?” 2007. The Melbourne Review: A Journal of Business and Public Policy, vol. 3, no. 2, Melbourne Business School, 2007, pp. 66–73, https://search.informit.org/doi/10.3316/informit.947150601744326.
- Allen, Geoff. “Public affairs and mining in Australia-a rescued license to operate.” Journal of Public Affairs, vol. 11, no. 4, May. 2011, pp. 382–386. https://doi.org/10.1002/pa.388.
- Allen, Geoff, "The Rise of Research-Based Policy Advocacy" in Mark Sheehan and Peter Sekuless, The Influence Seekers: Political Lobbying in Australia Australian Scholarly Publishing, 2012. ISBN 9781921875519
- Harsanyi, Fruzsina., Allen, Geoff. "Achieving the Strategic Potential of Public Affairs." The SAGE Handbook of International Corporate and Public Affairs. 55 City Road: SAGE Publications Ltd, 2017, pp. 65–81. Sage Knowledge, doi: https://doi.org/10.4135/9781473957916
- Allen, Geoff. “Towards a Strategic Function: The Evolution of the Public Affairs Management Profession in Australia.” The Palgrave Encyclopedia of Interest Groups, Lobbying and Public Affairs, 2020, pp. 1–15, https://doi.org/10.1007/978-3-030-13895-0_109-1

=== Reports ===
- The Press and the Public Service, Research Paper for the (Coombs) Royal Commission on Australian Government Administration, AGPS Canberra 1976.
- Corporate Community Investment in Australia, Report for the Prime Minister’s Community-Business Partnership, Australian Government, 2007.

== Awards ==
- In 2001 Allen received a Centenary Medal for "outstanding service to Australia's international trade".
- In 2008 Allen was recognised for his leadership and service and awarded the MBS Distinguished Alumnus Award.
- In 2009 Allen received the Member of the Order of Australia (AM), recognised for his service to business, "particularly in the area of corporate public affairs, through a range of executive roles with professional organisations, and to the community".
