= Business war games =

Simulating moves in a commercial setting

Business war gaming, corporate war gaming or business wargaming is an adaptation of the art of simulating moves and counter-moves in a commercial setting. In a complex global and competitive world, formulating a plan without testing it against likely external reactions is the equivalent of walking into a battlefield without the right weapons or a plan to win. In situations where the cost of being wrong is high, war games can be very helpful to understand from a 360-degree perspective the external opportunities and challenges of all the key stakeholders in the industry.

Unlike military war games or fantasy war games, which can be set hundreds of years in the past, business war games are usually set in the present and are a relatively recent development, but they are growing rapidly.

The rationale for running a business war game is that it is a tool of particular value when the competitive environment is undergoing a process of change, as it allows decision makers to consider proactively how different players can react to the change, and to each other. A "moderate level of uncertainty" provides the best setting for a business war game. The benefit of teams role playing competitors and developing more robust strategies is especially notable, and can be inferred from a quote such as the one below from Richard Clark, CEO of Merck and Co., who in an interview to USA Today said: "I am a strong believer in if you’re going to develop a vision or a strategic plan for the future of a company that you have to engage the organization in doing that…it can’t be just the CEO or top 10 executives sitting in a sterile conference room."

War games are used by many companies globally, and they are taught at some MBA programs.

== Methodologies ==
=== Competitive Success Playbook ===
The Competitive Success Playbook is a newly published war game methodology in 2024 which systematically breaks down the war gaming process into 9 steps, to help businesses quickly and efficiently implement war games at their companies. The steps are:

1. Objectives: Clearly identifying your organization's war game objectives
2. Battlefield: Assessing what your current battlefield looks like and who your competition is
3. Competition: Understanding the strategies of your key competitors
4. Reflection: Analyzing past battles
5. Preparation: Developing a plan to gather critical intelligence
6. Toolkit: Assessing the strength of your troops and resources
7. Scenarios: Determining which scenarios are most critical to your business
8. Battle: Developing Strategies and responding to scenarios
9. Competitive Success Playbook: Finalizing your playbooks and summarizing findings.

=== Classical Methodologies ===
==== Market level ====
Traditionally there have been three schools of thought about business war game, depending on the underlying philosophy of their creators: "Business is War" war games, "Business is a Game" war games, and "Business is Business" war games. The three types have accordingly, different strengths and weaknesses, and are useful for different applications throughout business.

==== "Business is War" ====
Sometimes abbreviated as 'BIW' war games, 'Business is War' games are a direct adaptation from the military war games, and envision competitors as the "enemy" and the goal as "victory" in a market "battle". These games are based on mathematical modeling of contestable markets, including chaos theory, random variable generation (Monte Carlo simulations), and econometric modeling of demand and supply conditions. Participants’ generated moves are fed into computer program which generates optimal solutions in the mathematical space. Not surprisingly these games come with a high price tag, and are advocated by large consulting firms which tend to work with the US military establishment.

==== "Business is a Game" ====
'BIG' war games regard business transactions as a game between participants with potentially conflicting goals. BIG advocates apply game theory, a branch of mathematics to business situations with the goal of finding an equilibrium, or "stable" solution (so called Nash equilibrium) whereby no one can further improve on the outcome. The solution can be computed over a large space of all possible (hypothetical) moves of the players. A leading proponent of this type of war games is Niall Fraser, a game theorist and the founder of a consultancy called Open Options. A variant on BIG is computer simulations’ games using simultaneous equations to solve for demand and supply equilibrium (not a game theory solution). Participants input numerical values for decisions on a wide range of business investments (in production, sales force, advertising, etc.), and receive a computer output of the equilibrium results. Another variant on BIG involves large numbers of simulations to explore the interaction of multiple competitors' strategies, without assuming an equilibrium or a mathematical solution exists. This approach, focusing on active competitors, recognizes that the number of possible actions and reactions is prohibitively large, while also recognizing that simulation can better explore and test decisions than the unaided human mind. Mark Chussil of Advanced Competitive Strategies uses this technology in simulators such as a pricing tournament.

==== "Business is Business" ====
Also referred to as 'BIB' regard business as neither a war nor a game. The goals and tactics of war are incompatible with business goals; competitors do not aim to defeat each other but to satisfy customers’ preferences better than others. Government precludes total victories and cooperation is as prevalent as competition. Similarly, BIB criticizes "Business is Game" thinking on the ground that hypothetical or generic moves are irrelevant or trivial, stable solutions are not a substitute for specific, real life practical and innovative strategies for management, and computer/mathematical simulations do not approach the complexity of competitive dynamics in real markets. Instead, BIB advocates using state-of-the-art competitor analysis techniques and real life competitive intelligence to generate an in-depth profiling of competitors through role playing. The goal of BIB is predicting most likely moves by most significant competitors or other third parties (customers, regulators) so that strategy can be pressure–tested in the most realistic setting. The creator of BIB games is Benjamin Gilad. A variation combines BIB war gaming with computer simulations. This approach, used by Mark Chussil, founder of Advanced Competitive Strategies, uses simulations to estimate the likely outcomes from moves made by a business, its competitors, and other relevant actors, across multiple scenarios. This approach allows for both competitive dynamics and quantitative analysis, at the cost of additional time to set up the war game. Yet another BIB variation involves large numbers of what-if simulations, in which the war game is designed by humans and conducted in a computer.

=== Negotiation level ===
In contrast to the often larger “Business is War”, “Business is a Game” and “Business is Business” war games, which all primarily deal with market level issues, Negotiation War Games are smaller in scope and only deal with business related negotiations. Even though the US military have long referred to the practice of ”War Gaming a negotiation”, the term ”Negotiation War Game” was first coined by Soren Malmborg in 2010.

==== Negotiation War Games (aka. NWG) ====
A "NWG" is a Business War Game conducted at negotiation level. I.e. a structured framework for conducting a preparatory Negotiation Simulation on a specific, upcoming negotiation.

A Negotiation War Game is most often divided into three steps: 1/ Gather Intelligence 2/ Simulate Upcoming Negotiation 3/ Debrief and calibrate negotiation strategy.

By adding Competitive Intelligence to the simulation, Negotiation War Gaming differentiates itself from normal mock negotiations and other training exercises. The act of gathering and including Competitive Intelligence on the forthcoming negotiation and its parties, lets participants in the Negotiation War Game gain an in-depth understanding of the negotiation itself and the negotiation parties.

The purpose of doing a Negotiation War Game is threefold; 1/ Predicting your opponents' next move 2/ Revealing opportunities, threats and issues 3/ Developing and testing a calibrated negotiation strategy.

==== Role-Play ====
Even though software applications can play an important role in the facilitation of a Role-Play Negotiation War Game, the method is inherently focused on role-play simulation. War Games can be used to prepare for virtually all two or three party negotiations. By gathering Competitive Intelligence on the actual negotiation (as well as the individuals involved) an accurate simulation can be created. A client's employees will then become involved in the actual War Game by acting partly as the company itself, partly as the other negotiating party. Through a series of structured simulations, a tailor-made strategy can then be developed and calibrated.

Role-Play Negotiation War Games are especially effective when preparing for sales and procurement negotiations. Through more than 30 years of business usage and scientific research, the method has been shown to generate significantly better negotiation outcomes compared to other popular methods. (Please see Application section below for references). In 2010, 64,7% of young US Sales-Managers Role-Played their upcoming negotiations, making "Pure Role-Play" Negotiation War Gaming one of the most used negotiation preparation techniques in North America. A leading proponent and provider of these types of War Games is Outcome Simulations ApS led by Soren Malmborg. As of 2013, Outcome's Negotiation War Gaming method is taught in MBA courses on negotiation at Columbia Business School and NYU Stern School of Business.

== Applications ==
=== BIW ===
Given the high budget requirements and long preparations time, BIW games are more appropriate for big companies' big decisions and large budgets, such as corporate games, involving top executives with considerable staff and consultant support. Corporate games are played over major portfolio decisions such as diversification and/or divestiture moves of the parent company (i.e., which acquisitions to go for, which business to get rid of), and over longer-term horizons. BIW games are less appropriate for business units, or business strategy decisions, as their high price tag and extensive time required from top executives are no match for small scale games with more tailored application and flexible format. To fully understand the difference between corporate games played over corporate strategy (portfolio management) and business games played over business strategy (competitive strategy), read Michael Porter's articles.

=== BIG ===
Game theory and computer simulation games are appropriate for planning and decision support in industries in relatively stable state, known distributions of outcomes, and predictable competitors, as they are best suited for finding equilibrium solutions among a relatively large set of known variables (payoffs and moves). On the other hand, BIG games are handicapped in rapidly changing industries, markets where surprise moves by new players is a possibility, situations requiring innovative and creative approaches, and in decisions calling for specific practical ideas rather than more generic moves (such as raise, stay or lower prices by x%). Decision makers looking at war gaming should also be minded of game theory's own lack of empirical support, as people seem to irrationally follow behaviors that do not result in their best outcome. (Chussil, of Advanced Competitive Strategies, argues that "irrational" behaviors can come from the complexity of competitive-strategy problems; it can be extremely difficult to identify behaviors that produce "best" outcomes.)

=== BIB ===
Business war games employing role-playing and competitor analytical techniques are most beneficial in business strategy at the business unit, market, brands, product and project levels. BIB games have been applied with great success to new product launches, offensive and defensive moves against specific competitors (whose response is analyzed using the advanced competitor analysis techniques), in organizational development's (training the next generation executive cadre) "competitive landscape" games, and in brand revival and new market entry situations. According to participants, BIB games provide touch reality-based challenge to strategies and plans that helps companies cope with uncertainty. They are less useful in conglomerate strategy as they apply to business strategy and not across unrelated industries. BIB are also more culture sensitive, and should be applied with caution in cultures where honest discussion of blindspots is less than appreciated. The methodological superiority of BIB games over other techniques received strong empirical support from a meta study on the effectiveness of predictions of competitive outcomes using "role playing".

=== NWG (Pure Role-Play) ===
"Pure Role-Play" Negotiation War Games have shown to generate significantly better predictions of negotiation outcomes compared to other popular methods. "Pure Role-Play" Negotiation War Games have also been shown to ensure significantly lower prices in procurement negotiations, and greater writedowns in auditor vs. client negotiations concerning obsolete inventory. "Pure Role-Play" War Games have been used extensively in business negotiations. "Pure Role-Play" War Games are furthermore often used in politics. Negotiation War Gaming was used to prepare President Ronald Reagan for his negotiations with Gorbachev in Reykevik and Geneva in 1985 and 1986. Presidential candidate John Kerry used a Negotiation War Game to prepare for his first TV-duel with George W. Bush in 2002. Both President Barack Obama and Mitt Romney used the method prior to the 2012 presidential TV-duels. The NTC (National Training Center, Fort Irwin. Ca.) recommend that all U.S. and Canadian Army officers be trained in the method before deployment.

=== Board Games ===
Board games can be used for business war games. In this case, they are war games for civilians applied with a marketing warfare analogy to a market situation. In this case, these authors talk about creative competitive intelligence.

== War games in business education ==
At the Southern Methodist University Cox School of Business, over 500 students a year study how to war game using different topics each year such as the Battle for the traveler, Battle for the cloud and others. At the Paul Merage School of Business at University of California, Irvine the final exam for the competitive intelligence class developed by Dr Leonard Lane and Arjan Singh is a war game in which the students role play various companies to try to win in the marketplace. Each year student teams have developed strategies - some of which have actually happened in the market place indicating that a war game is a very powerful predictive tool for business when planned properly.

== The war metaphor ==
To some, the war metaphor implicit in "business war game" is an accurate or useful depiction of business and competitive strategy. Others find the war metaphor potentially counterproductive. Some companies play up the war metaphor simply to encourage out-of-the-box thinking, while others downplay it with terms such as "strategy game."
