= Geoffrey Allen =

Geoffrey Allen or Geoff Allen may refer to:

- Sir Geoffrey Allen (chemist) (1928–2023), British chemist and academic
- G. Freeman Allen (1922–1995), author specialising in railways
- Geoffrey Allen (bishop) (1902–1982), bishop of Derby, 1959–1969
- Geoffrey Allen (priest) (born 1939), Archdeacon of North West Europe
- Geoff Allen (footballer) (born 1946), English footballer for Newcastle United
- Geoff Allen (businessman) (born 1941), Australian businessman

== See also ==
- Jeffrey Allen (disambiguation)
