= Phil Harris (academic) =

British political scientist (born 1952)

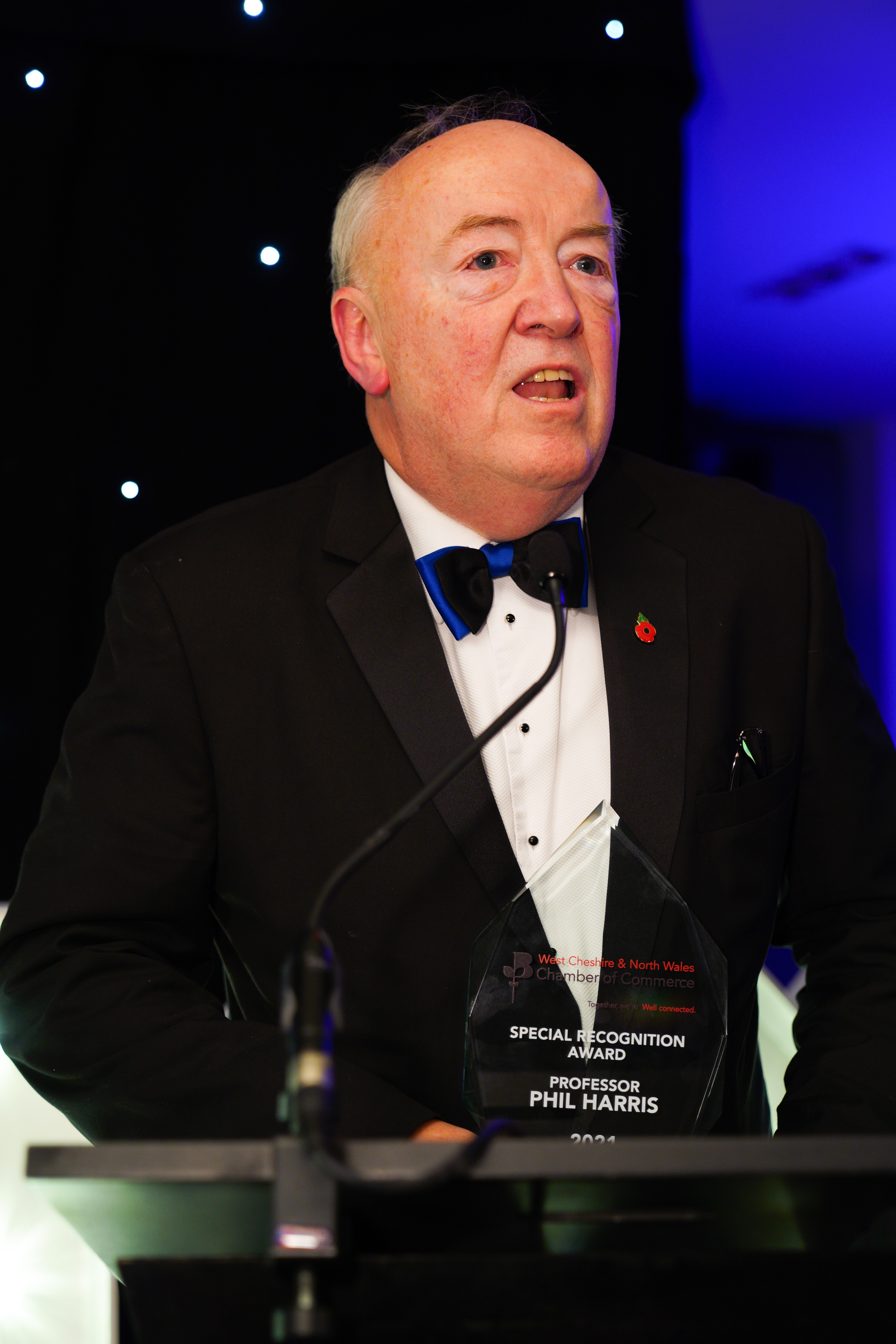
- Born: 2 March 1952 (age 74); Southall, Middlesex, London
- Citizenship: British
- Education: University of York (BA, 1979) University of Manchester (CertEd, 1989) Manchester Metropolitan University (PhD, 2000)
- Occupations: Marketing scholar, Political scientist, Professor
- Notable work: The Handbook of Public Affairs (2005), Penguin Dictionary of Marketing (2009), Lobbying in Europe (2017), co-editor of Palgrave Encyclopedia of Interest Groups, Lobbying and Public Affairs (2022)

Phil Harris (born 2 March 1952) is a British marketing scholar and political scientist. He is Professor Emeritus of Marketing and Public Affairs at the University of Chester and Woxsen University, Hyderabad, and Professor extraordinarius at the University of South Africa (UNISA). He is known for his research on public affairs, lobbying, political marketing, entrepreneurship and business-to-government relations. He is the joint founding editor of the Journal of Public Affairs and has authored or edited over 20 books and more than 200 academic articles.

== Early life and education ==
Harris was born in Southall, Middlesex, London, in 1952. He left school at 16 and his first job was working for Radio Luxembourg (208) in Mayfair, London, at the UK headquarters and recording studios of the original UK pop music station. In 1969, Harris moved with his family to Birkenhead and joined Joseph Rank Limited (subsequently RHM Limited), where he worked in the flour milling and animal feeds industry in clerical and trainee managerial roles in sales, purchasing, imports and production. RHM spotted his potential and sent him on a Leadership development course at The Outward Bound School, Burghead, Morayshire in (1970). They encouraged and supported his part time studies at Birkenhead Tech in Economics and Economic History which enabled him to go to University. During this period, he helped establish a Trade Union Branch of the Transport and General Workers Union for all office RHM staff based in Birkenhead Docks and became its first chairman.

Harris studied politics and economic history at the University of York (BA, 1979), where he served as President of the Students' Union (1978–79). He also served as Financial Vice Chairman of the Union of Liberal Students and stood for Deputy President of the National Union of Students (NUS). After graduating from York, he joined the senior executive training programme of the global chemical company ICI and worked in various Sales and Marketing roles in the UK and Brussels. He subsequently transferred to the ENI-ICI the Anglo Italian Joint Venture Company European Vinyls Corporation (EVC), before joining Manchester Polytechnic in 1987 as a Senior Lecturer in Business Studies. He subsequently gained a Certificate of Education from the University of Manchester (1989) and a PhD in marketing and public affairs from Manchester Metropolitan University (2000). His doctoral thesis examined lobbying and political marketing in the United Kingdom.

== Career ==
Harris began his academic career in 1987 when he joined the Faculty of Business and Management at Manchester Metropolitan University, where he taught Business Development and European Industrial Marketing. He co-founded the Centre for Corporate and Public Affairs in 1996 and later became Reader in Marketing and Public Affairs.

He was appointed Professor of Marketing at the University of Otago, New Zealand, where he gave his inaugural professorial lecture, "Machiavelli, Marketing & Management: Ends and Means in Public Affairs" (2006). He later became Head of the Department of Marketing (2005–07).

In 2009, Harris returned to the UK and joined the University of Chester as the Westminster (Grosvenor) Professor of Marketing and Public Affairs. He served as Executive Dean of the Faculty of Business, Enterprise, and Lifelong Learning (2009–2014), executive director of the Business Research Institute (2014–2020), and Director of the China Centre.

Harris is recognized for his research, teaching, and expertise in China. He has held visiting professorships in Longyan University, Fujian, Quanzhou Normal University, Fujian, Dezhou University, Shandong, Zaozhuang University, Shandong, Jiangsu University, Dalian Minzi University, Guanzi Normal University, Beijing Foreign Studies University (BFSU), Xiamen University of Technology, Tongji University, Shanghai, and Wuhan University of Technology, Hebei, China. He served as a Global Expert at BFSU from 2015 to 2018.

He has also held visiting positions at Baden-Württemberg Cooperative State University (DHBW), Lorrach, Germany. Oklahoma State University, Tulsa, USA, Manchester Business School, UK, and Erasmus Business School, Rotterdam, Netherlands He was made professor emeritus at the University of Chester in 2020.

He currently holds international appointments, including Professor Emeritus at Woxsen University, in Hyderabad (from 2022), and Professor Extraordinarius at UNISA (from 2021). Since 2024, he has served as Director of Global Research, Innovation, and Development at Nigerian British University, Asa, Abia.

== Research ==
Harris edited the Handbook of Public Affairs (2005) and authored the Penguin Dictionary of Marketing (2009) after five years of research. Later works include the International Handbook of Corporate and Public Affairs (2017) and Lobbying in Europe (2017). He was general editor-in-chief of the Palgrave Encyclopedia of Interest Groups, Lobbying, and Public Affairs (2022). His publications have addressed European lobbying, corporate social responsibility, political marketing, and electoral behaviour in the UK, New Zealand, and other international contexts.

Harris has also examined the modern relevance of Machiavelli, contributing to the organisation of the Machiavelli at 500 Symposium in Manchester (1998). His later work includes the edited volume Machiavelli, Marketing & Management: Revisited (2025) and The Sage Handbook of Political Marketing (2025).

In 2000, Harris co-founded the Journal of Public Affairs, which he edited until 2021. He has also served as senior editor of the Journal of Political Marketing and sat on editorial boards of journals such as the European Journal of Marketing, Journal of Marketing Management, Journal of Consumer Behaviour, and Marketing Theory.

== Professional leadership ==
Harris has held senior positions including Chairman of the Academy of Marketing (1999–2002), Chairman of the Marketing Council (UK) PLC (2005–08), trustee of the Chartered Institute of Marketing (2001–08), and board member of the American Marketing Association Global Interest Group.

He founded the Chester Forum in 2010, chaired the High Sheriff of Cheshire Enterprise Awards, and co-founded the Educate North Awards in 2015.

== Awards and honours ==
- Order of St. Agatha (Cavaliere), Republic of San Marino (2024)
- Lifetime Achievement Award, Educate North Awards (2024)
- Honorary International Ambassador, West Cheshire & North Wales Chamber of Commerce (2023)
- Special Recognition Award, West Cheshire & North Wales Chamber of Commerce (2021)
- President's Medal, Chartered Institute of Marketing (2008)
- Honorary Lifetime Fellowship, Academy of Marketing (2011)
- Freeman of the City of London (2012)

Harris is a Liveryman of the Worshipful Company of Marketors and a Fellow of the Royal Society of Arts, the Chartered Institute of Marketing, and the Academy of Marketing Science.

== Selected works ==
- Newer Insights into Marketing (with C. P. Schuster, 1999)
- Machiavelli, Marketing & Management (with A.Lock & P. Rees 2000)
- The Handbook of Public Affairs (with C. Fleisher, 2005)
- European Business and Marketing: Strategic Issues (with F. McDonald, 2004)
- Penguin Dictionary of Marketing, 2009
- International Handbook of Corporate and Public Affairs (with C. Fleisher, 2017)
- Lobbying in Europe (with A. Bitonti, 2017)
- Palgrave Encyclopedia of Interest Groups, Lobbying and Public Affairs (co-editor, 2022)
- Machiavelli, Marketing & Management: Revisited (co-editor), 2025
- The Sage Handbook of Political Marketing (co-editor), 2025
