= Babette Bensoussan =

Australian writer

Babette Bensoussan is an expert in competitive intelligence and decision-making coaching. Known as The Decision-Making Maverick, she helps individuals and organisations make better, more confident decisions. She is the author of influential books on competitive intelligence, including "Analysis without Paralysis", "Business and Competitive Analysis", and "Strategic and Competitive Analysis", which are widely used in MBA programs and executive courses around the world.

== Career and contributions ==
Babette has a wealth of experience in competitive intelligence. She was the founder and director of The MindShifts Group Pty. Ltd., a consulting firm based in Sydney, Australia. She is a recognised thought leader in the fields of business model analysis, competitive positioning, and strategic intelligence. She has taught competitive intelligence and analysis at Sydney Graduate School of Management and Bond University for undergraduate, MBA, and executive programs.

Babette was a founder and vice-president of the Society of Competitive Intelligence Professionals (SCIP) in Australia and has contributed to the Journal of Competitive Intelligence and Management and Competitive Intelligence Review editorial boards. Babette’s work extends to business strategy, competitive positioning analysis, four corners analysis, and shadowing, which has enabled leaders and organisations to stay ahead in competitive environments.

As The Decision-Making Maverick, Babette helps clients improve their decision-making skills, align their choices with personal and professional goals, and enhance their leadership capabilities. Through her coaching, she integrates energy leadership principles and provides practical tools to guide individuals in making better decisions that lead to lasting results.

== Publications ==
Babette has co-authored several influential books in competitive intelligence, including:

- 2008 Analysis without Paralysis, with Craig Fleisher (FT Press)
- 2007 Business and Competitive Analysis: Effective Application of New and Classic Methods, with Craig Fleisher (FT Press)
- 2007 Staying Ahead of the Competition: How Firms Really Manage Their Competitive Intelligence and Knowledge—Evidence from a Decade of Rapid Change, with C. Hall (World Scientific)
- 2003 Strategic and Competitive Analysis: Methods and Techniques for Analyzing Business Competition, with Craig Fleisher (Prentice Hall)

These works remain widely adopted in academic and professional settings worldwide.

== Awards and recognition ==
- 1997: Appointed a Fellow of SCIP (Strategic and Competitive Intelligence Professionals).
- 2006: Awarded the Alumni Award by the Macquarie Graduate School of Management for her contributions to competitive intelligence and leadership in the field.
- 2006: First Australian and international female recipient of the SCIP Meritorious Award, the highest global honour in the field of Competitive Intelligence.

== Public Speaking and Teaching ==
Babette has been a guest lecturer, keynote speaker, and trainer at major institutions and events globally. She has taught competitive intelligence at various universities, including the University of Western Sydney, Bond University, and University of Technology Sydney, and has delivered workshops and lectures in countries such as China, Singapore, the Philippines, the UK, Canada, and the USA.

She is also an Adjunct Professor at the University of Technology Sydney, School of Business.

== Education and certifications ==
- Bachelor of Business (Marketing and Economics), University of Technology Sydney (UTS)
- Master of Business Administration (MGSM)
- Certified Professional Coach (PCC), International Coaching Federation

== Personal life ==
Babette now lives with her husband on the Sunshine Coast, Queensland, where she continues her work helping clients make confident decisions that lead to personal and professional success.
