= Hakeem Fawehinmi =

Nigerian academic and administrator

Hakeem Babatunde Fawehinmi

Vice chancellor of Nigerian British University
- In office 2023–2025

Vice chancellor of University of Abuja
- In office December 2025 – Present

Personal details
- Born: Hakeem Babatunde Fawehinmi; 29 September 1969 (age 56) Ondo State
- Party: Non-Partisan
- Spouse: Hadeezat Omotayo Fawehinmi

Hakeem Babatunde Fawehinmi (born 29 September 1969) is a Nigerian Professor of Clinical Anatomy and Biomedical Anthropology and the Vice Chancellor of the University of Abuja (now Yakubu Gowon University). He took over the mantle of leadership of the University of Abuja from Professor Mathew Adamu, who served in an acting capacity since August 2025. Fawehinmi was appointed by the eleventh Governing Council of the University during its 80th extraordinary meeting held on November 7, 2025. Professor Fawehinmi had previously served in the same role at the Nigerian British University.

== Early life and background ==
Fawehinmi holds a Bachelor of Anatomy and MBBS from the University of Port Harcourt. He holds a Master of Medical Anthropology from the University of London and a Doctor of Medicine from the University of Port Harcourt.

== Career ==
Hakeem Fawehinmi started as a medical intern at the University of Port Harcourt Teaching hospital in 1992. From there he was employed as a lecturer II in 1995 by the same university and rose to the position of a professor in May 2010.

Fawehinmi served Head of Anatomy Department, Uniport from 2005 to 2007. He also served as Associate Dean and Dean, Faculty of Basic Medical Sciences, College of Health Sciences, University of Port Harcourt from 2012 to 2014.

He was the Deputy Vice Chancellor (Academic), University of Port Harcourt from 2016- 2020. He also served as the General Secretary and Member of the National Executive Council of Nigerian Medical Association, Rivers State Chapter from 1999 to 2000.

On February 16, 2023, he was appointed as the Vice Chancellor of the Nigerian British University by the Pro-Chancellor and Chairman of Governing Council of the Nigerian British University, Mr. Chukwuemeka Umeoji.
