= Jeffrey Allen =

Jeffrey Allen or Jeff Allan may refer to:

== Arts and entertainment ==
- Jeffery Renard Allen (born 1962), poet and author
- Jeffrey Allen, musician in R&B band Mint Condition
- Jeff Allen (musician) (born 1946), English drummer
- Jeff Allen (comedian) (born 1956), American comedian and film actor
- Jeff Allen, musician in swing revival band Alien Fashion Show

== Sports ==
- Jeff Allen (basketball) (born 1987), American basketball player
- Jeff Allen (defensive back, born 1958), American and Canadian football defensive back
- Jeff Allen (defensive back, born 1948), American football defensive back
- Jeff Allen (offensive lineman) (born 1990), American football offensive guard
- Jeff Allan (born 1957), Canadian ice hockey defenceman
- Jeff Allen (sprinter) (born 1976), American sprinter, 1998 All-American for the Stanford Cardinal track and field team

== See also ==
- Geoffrey Allen (disambiguation)
