= ACIL Allen =

Australian economic and policy consulting firm

ACIL Allen is an Australian economics, policy and strategy advisory firm, specialising in the use of applied economics and econometrics to analyse, develop and evaluate policy, strategy and programs. It is the result of the April 2013 merger between Allen Consulting Group and ACIL Tasman. ACIL Allen employs 65 consultants in offices across Australia.

== Background ==
The ACIL Consulting brand was established in the early 1980s. The Allen Consulting brand was established in the late 1980s by Geoff Allen, who prior to that was the foundation CEO of the Business Council of Australia. In March 1989 he was joined at Allen Consulting by Dr Vince FitzGerald, previously Secretary of the Australian Government’s Department of Employment Education and Training and Secretary of the Department of Trade.

In 2002 ACIL Consulting merged with Tasman Economics to create ACIL Tasman.

ACIL Allen was created in April 2013 as the result of a merger between ACIL Tasman and the Allen Consulting Group.

== Services ==
=== Economics ===
ACIL Allen's economic services are anchored in rigorous economic modelling and analysis. The firm applies systematic economic reasoning to real-world challenges, offering services such as computable general equilibrium (CGE) modelling, cost–benefit analysis, data science, demographic and workforce modelling, input–output modelling, energy market modelling, market advisory and due diligence, real options, and social return on investment analysis. The firm’s economic insights support both public- and private-sector clients across a wide array of sectors.

=== Public Policy ===
ACIL Allen advises governments, industry bodies, and non-profit organisations on the design, analysis, and implementation of public policy across multiple sectors. Their expertise includes developing policy frameworks, designing incentive-based instruments, conducting cost–benefit and regulatory impact analyses, preparing submissions to reviews and inquiries, and stakeholder engagement. The firm also provides regulatory support, including expert witness and litigation services. Their contributions span community services, education, justice and public safety, health and ageing and infrastructure.

=== Evaluation ===
ACIL Allen’s evaluation services focus on program and policy effectiveness, efficiency, and public value. They offer a full suite of evaluation activities, including strategic reviews and meta-evaluations; evaluation design and co-design using program logic models; evidence-based research; field research such as stakeholder consultations and surveys; cost-effectiveness and return-on-investment analysis; and capability building within client organisations acilallen.com.au. The firm adheres to professional ethical standards and the Australasian Evaluation Society’s guidelines, ensuring integrity and sustainability in evaluations.

=== Strategy ===
ACIL Allen provides strategy consulting to businesses, governments, and not-for-profit entities in economics and public policy. They support clients in anticipating and responding to current and emerging challenges by providing strategic planning, market analysis, and business case development across diverse industry sectors. Strategy services are part of their core offering alongside economics, policy, and evaluation, reinforcing their multidisciplinary approach.

== Consulting topics and clients ==
Since the merger in 2013, ACIL Allen now covers a wide range of industries and works across sectors that include agribusiness and natural resources, energy, government funded services and resources. Their clients are from both government and the private sector.

=== 2023 ===
A report was published in April 2023 on the back of work done for ACIL Allen's client the Australian Research Council. ACIL Allen was engaged to independently evaluate the outcomes and impacts of NCGP-funded research over the past 2 decades and consider the potential future benefits delivered from the funding.

The Department of Climate Change, Energy, the Environment and Water (DCCEEW) engaged ACIL Allen (with subcontractors GHD), to develop options for a formal Gas Reliability Standard(s) for the interconnected east coast markets. The purpose of such a standard(s) is to provide a benchmark(s) against which system adequacy can be assessed, reliability gaps can be identified, and to support the development and implementation of new gas security and reliability mechanisms. The report was published on 7 May 2023.

ACIL Allen was engaged to conduct a Rapid Current State Assessment for the Global Advanced Industries Hub. This initiative is designed to transform the Western Trade Coast Precinct, comprising the Kwinana Industrial Area (KIA), Rockingham Industrial Zone (KIZ), Australian Marine Complex (AMC) and Latitude 32. The establishment of the Global Advanced Industries Hub will help to support key strategic priorities of government and industry development strategies for the battery and critical minerals, renewable energy, defence, LNG and other advanced manufacturing industries. The report was published in May 2023.

=== 2022 ===
In October 2022, ACIL Allen was engaged to support the preparation of a Clean Economy Workforce Development Strategy. The Clean Economy Workforce Development Strategy is part of the Victorian Government Clean Economy Workforce Skills Initiative, which also comprises a Clean Economy Skills and Jobs Taskforce and Clean Economy Workforce Capacity Building Fund. The purpose of the Strategy is to provide a ten-year framework to inform government planning and investment in skills and training for the Victorian workforce, to deliver the state government’s commitments on climate resilience and the transition to net zero emissions by 2050.

=== 2021 ===
ACIL Allen was engaged by the Australian Department of Health to evaluate the performance of the second National Partnership on Essential Vaccines (NPEV) and identify achievements and limitations. The review informed decisions regarding the treatment of the second NPEV upon its expiry. It considers whether policy objectives and outcomes and/or outputs of the second NPEV have been achieved and whether they have been delivered in an effective, efficient and appropriate manner.

In February, the Australian Energy Regulator (AER) released its draft Default Market Offer (DMO) retail electricity prices for public consultation. ACIL Allen developed the report, titled "Default Market Offer: Wholesale energy and environmental costs estimates for DMO 3 Draft determination".

ACIL Allen supported the AER in designing the forecasting approach for the wholesale and environmental cost components of the DMO.

On 12 March, Prime Minister Malcolm Turnbull joined Industry Super Australia chairman Greg Combet to discuss the future of the super system and to launch a new independent report. Commissioned by Industry Super Australia and developed by ACIL Allen, the report - Economic Impact of increasing the Super Guarantee Rate - showed how an increase in the Super Guarantee will lead to a bigger economy, more jobs, higher real wages and higher real incomes for Australians.

In June 2021, the Victorian Department of Education and Training engaged ACIL Allen to outline the policy environment for mobilising Australian Early Development Census (AEDC) data with schools and communities and the relevance of data in achieving policy goals. There was a particular interest in social and emotional well-being given limited improvement in AEDC results over time and the potential impacts of COVID-19. The engagement examined the policies of government from the years before school, during school and into early post school years. The report documents the policy environment for mobilising Australian Early Development Census data across the early life course as part of a comprehensive monitoring system approach.

A collective of Western Australian aged care providers engaged ACIL Allen in December 2020 to produce a detailed study quantifying the important economic and social impact of the Aged Care Sector to Western Australia’s economy and society more broadly. The report was launched at a Business News breakfast event in Perth on 28 May 2021.

ACIL Allen has on several occasions been engaged by the Commonwealth Department of Industry, Science, Energy and Resources to undertake emission projections for the electricity sector through to 2030 as part of Australia’s overall emission projections. These projections form part of Australia’s reporting obligations under the United Nations Framework Convention on Climate Change (UNFCCC).

ACIL Allen was commissioned by the Victorian Department of Education and Training in 2017 to conduct an evaluation of the Respectful Relationships initiative. The Respectful Relationships initiative supports schools and early childhood settings to promote and model respect, positive attitudes and behaviours. The evaluation examined the implementation and effectiveness, measuring the impact on students, staff and school communities and funded early childhood education programs. This project is ongoing until 2024.

=== 2020 ===
In partnership with the Seedling Group, ACIL Allen led the project ‘Don’t judge, and listen: keys to breaking down drug and alcohol use stigma’, by appointment from the Queensland Mental Health Commission. The research explored the impact of stigma and discrimination related to problematic alcohol and other drug use on Aboriginal and Torres Strait Islander communities, families and individuals living in Queensland. The report to the Queensland Mental Health Commission was published in March 2020.

In April 2020, ACIL Allen was commissioned by the University of Sydney to assess the economic contribution and impact the University has made to the national and state economies from 2006 to 2019.

In April and July 2020, ACIL Allen conducted a stocktake of drought resilience research, development, extension and adoption (RDE&A) knowledge for the Future Drought Fund. This work, on behalf of the Australian Department of Agriculture, Water and the Environment was to inform its future strategic investment in drought resilience RDE&A.

In 2020, ACIL Allen conducted an independent review into the functions, performance and efficiency of Meat & Livestock Australia.

In June 2020, the Port Hedland Industries Council (PHIC) announced the publication of a new report (the report was originally commissioned and produced in 2017). Since the findings in the 2017 report, the Port of Port Hedland has seen significant development, including increased activity in and around the port, elevating the economic value of the port to the region. The impact of the trade that is facilitated through the port to the local, state and national economies was so significant, it resulted in the PHIC, in conjunction with the Pilbara Ports Authority (PPA) once again engaging ACIL Allen to develop the new report that provided an assessment and updated on the findings from the 2017 report. That report, as mentioned previously was titled "The economic significance of the port of Port Hedland" and was published in June 2020.

With increasing focus on hydrogen as an alternative energy source, ACIL Allen has been conducting research into its economic viability and the development of a National Hydrogen Strategy, since 2003. A number of reports have been produced on the back of this and further research that has been conducted. The most recent report was published in January 2020 and found renewable electrolysis to be the most expensive method of hydrogen production, when compared with other methods. ACIL Allen also prepared several of the reports and papers commissioned by the National Hydrogen Strategy Taskforce.

ACIL Allen’s Director Jerome Fahrer provided expert evidence on behalf of the claimants in the Robodebt class action in 2020.

In December of 2020, the report on an economic model for the Australian sugar industry trade and market access strategy was published. For this work, ACIL Allen was engaged by Sugar Research Australia (SRA) to develop SugarMark, a multi-region computable general equilibrium model that would incorporate a detailed specification of the global sugar supply chain. The work involved analysis of the application of SugarMark to inform the trade-policy and market-access strategy of the Australian sugar industry.

=== 2019 ===
Geoscience Australia commissioned ACIL Allen for an independent analysis quantifying the return on investment from selected Exploring for the Future (EFTF) projects that are representative of the nature of the work done under the program. The objective was to develop a plausible and economically robust estimate of the returns to government through increased government revenue as a result of the case study projects.

In 2019, ACIL Allen, in conjunction with GHD, produced the report Hydrogen to support electricity systems for the Department of Environment, Land, Water and Planning (DELWP).

Over several years, ACIL Allen has worked with ElectraNet in South Australia providing estimates around wholesale electricity prices. The most recent work, in 2019 updated earlier analysis (from 2018) of the impact Project EnergyConnect might have on wholesale electricity prices in South Australia.

=== 2018 ===
In the 2018 South Australian state election, the Liberal Party was required to issue a retraction by the electoral commissioner after they misrepresented ACIL Allen modelling.

In August 2018, the report "Opportunities for Australia from Hydrogen Exports" was published. The Australian Renewable Energy Agency commissioned ACIL Allen to produce the report.

=== 2017 ===
In its bid to wins power at the March state election, the South Australian Liberal Party announced its intention to spend $200 million on fast-tracking a new electricity interconnector to NSW to bolster the fragile electricity grid. Economic modelling conducted by ACIL Allen Consulting showed the average household power bill would decline by up to $302 a year under the Liberal plan, by 2021-2022.

In 2017, the report "South Australian Green Hydrogen Study" was produced by ACIL Allen, for the Department of Premier & Cabinet, in conjunction with Advisian and Siemens.

=== 2016 ===
In 2016, ACIL Allen conducted research for the Australian Automobile Association on transport infrastructure funding. The report that came from that research, called for a new funding model, with the research indicating that the federal government was likely to invest, "less than half the $81 billion in taxes it takes from motorists in new transport infrastructure over the next five years."

=== 2015 ===
In 2015 ACIL Allen undertook a study on behalf of the property industry’s peak lobby, the Property Council of Australia. Analysis of the results determined that "Australia’s economy could be almost $40 billion better off if state and federal governments abolish a series of inefficient taxes, increase the GST rate to 12.5 per cent and broaden it to include fresh food, education and health."

=== 2013 ===
ACIL Allen Senior Associate Vince Fitzgerald provided litigation support as an expert witness for the AGS to support the government’s mandating of plain tobacco packaging.
