= Fuld-Gilad-Herring Academy of Competitive Intelligence =

Educational institution

The Fuld-Gilad-Herring Academy of Competitive Intelligence is an educational organization bringing professional training to the field of competitive intelligence (CI). Established in 1996, the academy has provided training to thousands of managers from 58 countries on six continents at its campuses in Cambridge, MA and Brussels, Belgium. The academy is the only CI-dedicated institution to be externally accredited by the International Accreditors for Continuing Education and Training (IACET). It grants the Competitive Intelligence Professional (CIP) certification based on a 9-course program, including a course in ethics and a course in business war gaming. To be certified, managers must complete the required coursework and pass a certification exam. The academy offers two levels of certification, a basic CIP-I and an advanced CIP-II, to accommodate both managers whose main interest is in using CI tools and managers working as CI professionals. The academy describes itself as the largest training institute in its field.

== Competitive Intelligence Standards ==
In March 2011, the board of Strategic and Competitive Intelligence Professionals (SCIP), the professional association in the field of competitive intelligence, voted to adopt the academy's CIP program as its official global certification program to help create standards in the field of strategic and competitive intelligence. The certification was renamed the SCIP-CIP certificate conferred by ACI.

== History ==
The history of the academy closely tracks the history of the field of competitive intelligence, which rose in importance during the 1980s with the increase in global competitive pressures and the spread of Internet search engines, which made information more accessible. In 1986, the Society of Competitive Intelligence Professionals (SCIP) was founded in Washington, DC to serve as the professional association for academics, practitioners and consultants in CI. During the next decade, organizations experimented with acquiring and using CI with little discipline and no consistent results. For example, a survey by the academy showed that one of CI's main objectives, avoiding strategic surprises, was not being accomplished in many large companies. Three early developers of the Society banded together to create a standard of training and performance in the field: Leonard Fuld, whose book Competitor Intelligence was the first best seller on the subject; Ben Gilad, whose book The Business Intelligence System became a benchmark for setting up a corporate CI function; and Jan Herring, who was the founding director of the first competitive intelligence function, created in 1982 at Motorola Corp. Together with the growth of SCIP, the creation of the academy contributed to the formalization and acceptance of CI functions and positions across global companies. Some have estimated that 97% of Fortune 500 corporations have at least one CI analyst in each of their larger business units.

== Competition ==
As the field continued to evolve, several other organizations began offering training programs in competitive intelligence, mostly as extensions of other degree programs. Among them are the Mercyhurst College Institute for Intelligence Studies in PA (an extension of a government intelligence program), Simmons College in MA (part of Library and Information studies), and the University of Denver in CO (part of a graduate degree in information management). Other programs include the Ecole de Guerre Economique in France and the Institute for Competitive Intelligence in Germany. Entry- level courses are also offered by the Society of Competitive Intelligence Professionals.

== Student body ==
The academy's alumni include managers and professionals from competitive and market intelligence functions, marketing, market research, business development and strategic planning, as well as research scientists and development engineers. Though the typical trainee is a manager at a Global Fortune 500 company, past participants have included representatives from the Catholic Church, various governments' defense agencies, farmer cooperatives, national economic development boards, and a cabinet minister.

== Faculty ==
- Leonard M. Fuld
- Michael Sandman, B.S. (Clark University), MA, M.B.A. (Cornell University)
- Dr. Helen Rothberg, PhD, MPhil. (City University of New York), M.B.A. (City University of New York at Baruch College), associate professor at Marist College School of Management
- Jan Herring, BSc. (University of Missouri)
- Ashish Nanda, A.M. (Harvard University), PhD (Harvard Business School), associate professor at the Harvard Law School
- Jules Schwartz, PhD (Harvard Business School), former dean and a professor emeritus of Boston University School of Management, former faculty member Wharton School
- Ben Gilad, former strategy professor at Rutgers University School of Management
- Jay Paap, PhD (MIT Sloan), has held faculty positions at Sloan and Indiana University
- Dan Mulligan, M.A. (USMA Westpoint), Assistant Professor at the Mercyhurst College Institute for Intelligence Studies

== Advisory board ==
The academy's advisory board includes executives from US-based Intel, Procter and Gamble, Genentech, Blue Cross Blue Shield, Microsoft, Fidelity and Wyeth corporations, as well as Europe-based Shell, Roche, TetraPak and Orange, and Mexico-based Cemex.
