= Mohanbir Sawhney =

Indian business theorist

- Born: 1963 (age 62–63); Kalaikunda, India
- Education: IIT Delhi; IIM Calcutta; Wharton
- Occupations: Professor, Author, Consultant
- Spouse(s): Parminder Batra (divorced), Tia (divorced), Shalini Sharma (current).
- Website: mohansawhey.com

Mohanbir Sawhney (born 1963) is a management consultant, author and academic. He is the Associate Dean, Digital Innovation at McCormick Foundation Chair of Technology, Clinical Professor of Marketing and the Director of the Center for Research in Technology & Innovation at the Kellogg School of Management. He is an adviser to several large organizations on e-commerce strategies.

== Personal life and education ==
Sawhney was born in West Bengal, India.

He holds a Ph.D. in marketing from the Wharton School of the University of Pennsylvania; an MBA from the Indian Institute of Management Calcutta; and a bachelor's degree in electrical engineering from the Indian Institute of Technology, New Delhi.

== Career ==
Sawhney is a professor at Northwestern University. He became popular after publishing a seminal article, Lets get vertical published in Business 2.0 Magazine.

He teaches and leads an online Product Strategy Course from Kellogg School of Management - Northwestern University via the Emeritus learning Platform.

He co-authored Innovation capitalist, an innovation intermediary.

He gives talks around the world, advising companies on their online strategies.

Woxsen’s Case Study Centre at Woxsen University has been renamed as Mohanbir Sawhney Case Study Centre after him.

== Bibliography ==
- Collaborating with Customers to Innovate (2008) with Emanuela Prandelli and Gianmario Verona from Bocconi University of Milan (Italy)
- The Global Brain: your Roadmap for Innovating Smarter and Faster in the Networked World (2007)
- Marketing in the Network Economy
