= Benjamin Gilad =

Israeli-born author, consultant and teacher of competitive intelligence

Benjamin Gilad is an author, consultant, and teacher in the field of competitive intelligence. He is a co-founder of the Fuld-Gilad-Herring Academy of Competitive Intelligence. He was educated in psychology and philosophy at Tel Aviv University. After moving to the United States he studied business at Central Missouri State University, and later obtained a PhD from New York University. He is the author of The Business Intelligence System, Business Blind Sports, Early Warning, Business War games, and articles related to the field of competitive intelligence.
