= Craig Fleisher =

Canadian businessman and writer

Craig S. Fleisher is a scholar, advisor and author who has written or edited several books on public affairs, business, and competitive intelligence and analysis. Before becoming Dean of the Business School at the College of Coastal Georgia, he was awarded two endowed research chair positions while a Professor of Business (Strategy & Environment) at the Odette School of Business, University of Windsor, Ontario, Canada. His research addresses the areas of business and competitive intelligence, corporate public affairs (government relations and lobbying), and performance management and measurement. Since 2011 Dr. Fleisher has served as the Chief Learning Officer of Aurora WDC, a 20+ year old professional services firm (PSF) headquartered in Madison, Wisconsin, USA.

== Background, education and academic career ==
Fleisher received his PhD in business from the Katz Graduate School of Business, University of Pittsburgh, his MBA in human resource management and marketing from the Owen Graduate School of Management, Vanderbilt University, and BSBA in finance, insurance and real estate from the University of Florida. In the past, he held positions in mortgage banking management, real estate appraisal, and management consulting. His first academic appointment was at University of Calgary as associate professor in policy and environment. He maintained various professorial and program leadership roles at the School of Business and Economics at Wilfrid Laurier University in Waterloo, Ontario, and was at the University of Windsor as the endowed chair. He has held decanal positions at the University of New Brunswick. He serves as an adjunct professor in business information management at Tampere University of Technology (Finland), adjunct professor at the Wisconsin School of Business, University of Wisconsin in Madison, member of the graduate faculty for the Executive MScom at the Università della Svizzera italiana in Lugano, Switzerland, has also served as a visiting professor or scholar at the University of Sydney (Australia), De Montfort University (Leicester, UK), University of Western Sydney and University of Waikato (Hamilton, New Zealand), among others.

He was named the Meritorious award and Fellow of the Society of Competitive Intelligence Professionals (Alexandria, Virginia, USA); the only Canadian winner. His teaching earned him the title as one of Canada's top MBA professors by Canadian Business Magazine in 2006.

== Research and writing ==
Fleisher's academic research primarily focuses on two distinct areas of business activity, business and competitive intelligence, and corporate public affairs. Fleisher's dissertation was in the area of measuring public affairs performance, and his research on public affairs benchmarking, performance measurement, and management is among the most cited according to Google Scholar in this field. His two books on these topics, published in 1995 and 1998 by the Public Affairs Council were recognized as the Council's best-sellers at the time. His other major contributions in the field of corporate and public affairs are the two scholarly handbooks "The SAGE Handbook of International Corporate and Public Affairs" in 2017 and the Handbook of Public Affairs (Sage, 2005) with his colleague Dr. Phil Harris from University of Chester, United Kingdom.

Since 2000, Fleisher is known for his work in the area of business insights and competitive intelligence, particularly in pushing for the professionalization of the field. He published 3 edited volumes with his Wilfrid Laurier University Marketing professorial colleague David Blenkhorn, those being Managing Frontiers in Competitive Intelligence in 2001 (Quorum Books, an imprint of the Greenwood Publishing Group), Controversies in Competitive Intelligence published in 2003 and Global Business and Competitive Intelligence in 2005 by Praeger Publishers.

== Other professional experience ==
In addition to his work in academia, Fleisher served as President of the Board of Directors of the Society of Competitive Intelligence Professionals (Alexandria, Virginia, USA), inaugural chair of the Competitive Intelligence Foundation (Washington, DC) - an organization that he also founded and helped launch with then-SCIP Executive Director Alexander Graham, President of the Canadian Council for Public Affairs Advancement, Editor of the Journal of Competitive Intelligence and Management, Associate Editor of the Journal of Public Affairs published by John Wiley & Sons, and on the editorial boards of the International Journal of Technology Intelligence and Planning (Inderscience Publishers), Asia Pacific Public Relations Journal, South African Journal of Information Management, Competitive Intelligence Review, Public Affairs, and SCIP Online. He is also a long-time contributor to the Academy of Management's Social Issues in Management division, a founding member of the International Association of Business and Society, a life member of the International Association of Business Communicators, and a 2007 Canadian award-winning faculty advisor for the Golden Key International Honour Society.

== Partial bibliography ==
Fleisher is the author of more than ten books and more than one hundred peer-reviewed academic articles in various journals or academic serials. The following bibliography lists a few of his recent publications:

- Harris, Phil and Craig S. Fleisher (2017). The SAGE Handbook of International Corporate and Public Affairs, London: SAGE.
- Bensoussan, Babette, and Craig S. Fleisher (2013; 2007). Analysis without Paralysis: 2nd Edition, London: FT Press.
- Bensoussan, Babette, and Craig S. Fleisher (2009). Financial Times Guides: Analysis for Managers - Effective Planning Tools and Techniques, London: FT Press.
- Fleisher, Craig S., and Babette E. Bensoussan, (2015 2nd Ed; 2007). Business and Competitive Analysis: Effective Application of New and Classic Methods, London: FT Press.
- Harris, Phil, and Craig S. Fleisher (2005). Handbook of Public Affairs, London: SAGE.
- Blenkhorn, David, and Craig S. Fleisher (2005). Competitive Intelligence and Global Business, Westport, CT: Praeger Publishers.
- Fleisher, Craig S., and Babette E. Bensoussan, (2003). Strategic and Competitive Analysis: Methods and Approaches to Analyzing Business Competition (also translations published in Chinese, Japanese, Korean, Russian, and an international edition), Upper Saddle River, NJ: Prentice Hall.
- Fleisher, Craig S. (1997). Assessing, Managing and Maximizing Public Affairs Performance, Washington, DC: Public Affairs Council.
- Fleisher, Craig S. (1995). Public Affairs Benchmarking, Washington, DC: Public Affairs Council.
- Allen, Geoff. Journal of Public Affairs, 2006, 6(3/4).
- Book News Inc. (2007). Portland Oregon.
- Blenkhorn, D. and C. S. Fleisher. Competitive Intelligence and Global Business. Westport, CT: Praeger, 2005.
- Dishman, P., Fleisher, C. S., and V. Knip. "Chronological and Categorized Bibliography of Key Competitive Intelligence Scholarship: Part 1 (1997–2003)", Journal of Competitive Intelligence and Management, 1(1), 16-78.
- Fleisher, Craig S., Wright, Sheila , and R. Tindale. "Bibliography and Assessment of Key Competitive Intelligence Scholarship: Part 4 (2003-2006)", Journal of Competitive Intelligence and Management, 2007, 4(1), 32-92.
- Fleisher, Craig S. and Babette E. Bensoussan. Business and Competitive Analysis: Effective Application of New and Classic Methods, FT Press, 2007.
- Fleisher, C. S. (2003). "Competitive Intelligence Education: Competencies, Sources and Trends," Information Management Journal, March/April, 56-62.
- Fleisher, Craig S. (2003). "Should the Field be Called 'Competitive Intelligence?' pp. 56–69 in Fleisher, Craig S., and David Blenkhorn [eds.], Controversies in Competitive Intelligence: The Enduring Issues. Westport, CT: Praeger, 2003.
- Fleisher, Craig S., Knip, Victor, and P. Dishman. "Bibliography and Assessment of Key Competitive Intelligence Scholarship: Part 2 (1990–1996), Journal of Competitive Intelligence and Management, 2003, 1(2), 11-86.
- Fleisher, Craig S., and Babette E. Bensoussan. Strategic and Competitive Analysis: Methods and Techniques for Analyzing Business Competition. Prentice Hall, Upper Saddle River, 2003.
- Fleisher, Craig S., and David Blenkhorn. Managing Frontiers in Competitive Intelligence. Westport, CT: Quorum, 2001.
- Knip, Victor, P. Dishman, and C. S. Fleisher. "Bibliography and Assessment of Key Competitive Intelligence Scholarship: Part 3 (The Earliest Writings-1989)", Journal of Competitive Intelligence and Management, 2003, 1(3), 10-79.
