= Woxsen University =

Private university in Telangana, India

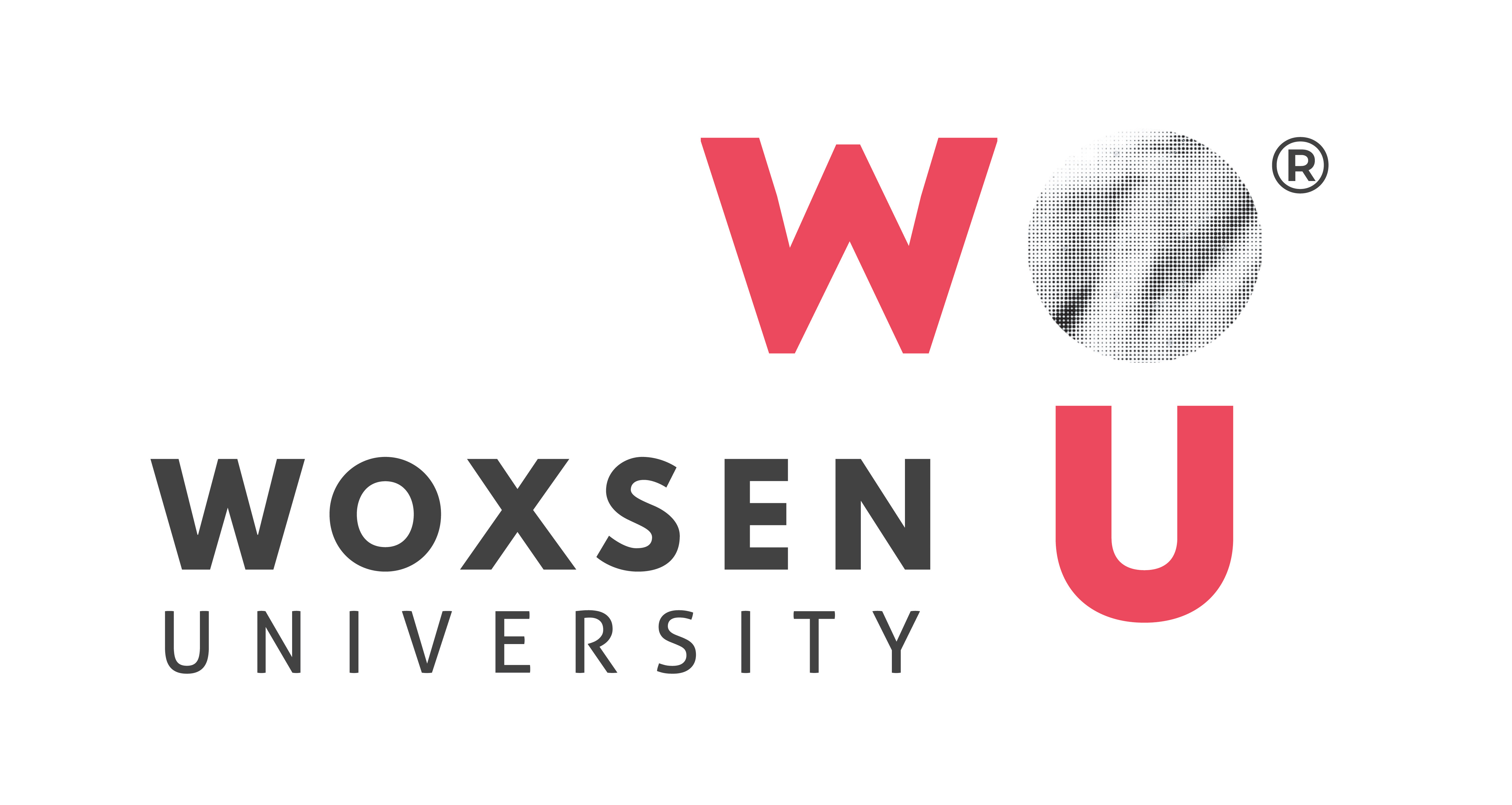
- Former name: Woxsen School of Business
- Type: Private University
- Established: 2014; 12 years ago
- Founder: Praveen K. Pula
- Chancellor: Praveen K. Pula
- Vice-Chancellor: Dr. V. J. Byra Reddy
- Location: Hyderabad, Telangana, India; 17°38′47″N 77°47′59″E
- Campus: 200 Acre; Residential Campus
- Website: www.woxsen.edu.in

Woxsen University in 2014 is a private university in Telangana, India. It has a 200-acre residential campus, consisting of constituent schools such as the School of Business, School of Technology, School of Art & Design, School of Law, School of Liberal Arts and Humanities, and School of Architecture and Planning.

== Campus ==
The 200 acre fully-residential campus of Woxsen University is located at Sadashivapet, about 70kms from the city of Hyderabad, Telangana.

== Academic Programs ==
=== Graduate Programs ===
1. B.Tech
2. BBA (Hons.)
3. BBA+MBA (Integrated)
4. B. Arch
5. B.Des (Hons.)
6. BA (Hons.)
7. BA LLB (Hons.)
8. BBA LLB (Hons.)
9. B.Sc (Hons.)
10. BCA

=== Post-Graduate Programs ===
- MBA (General)
- MBA (Financial services)
- MBA (Business analytics)

=== Doctoral Programs ===
- Ph.D. in Business & Management
- Ph.D in Engineering & Technology
- Ph.D in Law
- Ph.D in Architecture & Planning
- Ph.D in Liberal Arts and Humanities
- Ph.D in Sciences
- Ph.D in Arts & Design

== Research ==
=== Centre of Excellence (CoE) ===
The Centre of Excellence at Woxsen University serves as a hub for research and development, focusing on specialized areas and emerging technologies. Woxsen University is home to a variety of CoEs, including 15 at the university level, 26 at the faculty level, and 21 specifically dedicated to students.

The role of CoEs at Woxsen University is to encourage interdisciplinary collaboration, promote the exchange of knowledge among researchers, faculty members, and students. They support research and skill enhancement, aligning with the university's commitment to advancing academic and industry progress. Through partnerships with various industries, the CoEs meet the evolving demands of the corporate sector.

=== AI Research Centre ===
The artificial intelligence Research Centre at Woxsen University is an institution focused on advancing AI research and innovation. It consists of a group of researchers, faculty, and students who explore domains such as machine learning, natural language processing, computer vision, robotics, and the emerging field of the Metaverse. The centre aims to develop AI solutions that address real-world challenges and contribute to progress across various sectors. To facilitate research activities, the centre provides advanced infrastructure and computational resources.

=== Honorary Chairs ===
Woxsen University has set up a number of honorary chairs in a variety of management domains. Examples are the Amitava Chattopadhyay Chair of Consumer Insights and Innovation, the Cary Cooper Chair of Organizational Psychology, the Vijay Govindarajan Chair of Strategy and Innovation, the Andreas Kaplan Chair of Responsible Research, the Steven Pinker Chair of Cognitive Psychology, the Mohanbir Sawhney Chair of Digital Marketing, and the Valarie Zeithaml Chair of Services Marketing.

=== Mohanbir Sawhney Case Study Centre ===
The Woxsen Case Study Centre (CSC) also called as Mohanbir Sawhney Case Study Centre is an institution established within Woxsen University with a focus on fostering the case study ecosystem. Collaborating closely with the university's faculty members, the CSC engages in the development and publication of a collection of case studies. These case studies are subsequently distributed to reputable publishers, case centers, and academic institutions, including Harvard Business Publishing, Ivey Publishing, and Yale University.

== Allegations of fraudulent research rank boosting ==
In 2026, researcher Mohd. Asif Shah alleged that Woxsen had promised him payment in exchange for his publications and patents nominally being affiliated with the university, but had failed to pay him on time. Retraction Watch described such practices as a "publishing scam" designed to inflate the university's rankings.

== Social Impact ==
Woxsen University has many social impact initiatives. One initiative is "Project Aspiration," providing targeted training sessions for female students from disadvantaged backgrounds on topics such as SMART goals, mental health, and life skills. Students are also involved in "Street Cause," a nationwide organization focused on uplifting rural India through fundraising campaigns and educational activities. The university promotes sustainable practices, including vertical farming techniques to maximize crop yields while minimizing land and water usage. Additionally, students have developed the "Portable De-moisturizer," a device that efficiently dries natural produce without wastage. Woxsen University collaborates with Monmouth University in the "Woxsen-Monmouth Elevate Program," aiming to uplift underprivileged students in Telangana by addressing areas such as health, education, inequalities, and economic growth.

== Accreditation ==
Woxsen University has been granted EFMD MBA Program Accreditation, recognizing the high quality of its MBA program. Additionally, Woxsen University is accredited by the Bar Council of India, which regulates legal practices and education in the country. The Council of Architecture has also accredited the university's B.Arch program.

Woxsen University as a member is affiliated with organizations such as the Association to Advance Collegiate Schools of Business (AACSB) Business Education Alliance, the Association of MBAs (AMBA) Development Network, and the Global Business School Network (GBSN).

Woxsen University is also member of institutions like the Association of Management Development Institutions in South Asia (AMDISA), Responsible Research in Business & Management (RRBM), Principles for Responsible Management Education (PRME), Globally Responsible Leadership Initiative (GRLI), International Sustainable Campus Network (ISCN), Association for the Advancement of Sustainability in Higher Education (AASHE), the Association for the Advancement of Cost Engineering (AACE), the Society for Learning Analytics Research (SoLAR), and the MHRD's Innovation Cell. These memberships foster responsible practices, promote sustainability, and encourage innovation in the university.

== Rankings ==
Woxsen University's MBA program is globally ranked 151+ in QS Business Master's Rankings 2024. Additionally, Bloomberg ranked the School of Business at Woxsen University 6th among the Best Business Schools 2024 - 25 in the Asia Pacific region.

Woxsen university was ranked 2nd among private design schools in India by the IIRF. According to the Times B-School Ranking, it secured the 11th position among top 100 private universities and the 3rd position among top 20 B-schools in the southern region. The university was also ranked 12th among the top 130 institutions in India by Outlook I-Care 2024 and among the top best B-Schools beyond IIMs by Dalal Street Journal 2024. Education World ranked Woxsen University as the 28th top engineering college in India. Outlook I-Care also ranked the School of Technology at Woxsen University 20th among All India Top 160 Private Institutes for its B.Tech program.

In 2022, Businessworld recognized it as the all India top 15 top private B-schools.

In 2021, Woxsen University ranked 1st as the top emerging engineering college according to the Times Engineering Survey. It also ranked 5th in the national impact category as one of the top private universities by the IIRF.

== Student Life ==
Woxsen University is leaned towards facilitating both professional and personal growth of students through wide range of Student Clubs, Sports Arena and Cultural Events.

== Sports Facilities ==
Woxsen University offers a wide range of athletic and recreational facilities for students. These include:

=== The League ===
- Five-a-side Football Fields
- ITF Standard Tennis Courts
- FIBA Standard Box Basketball Courts
- Golf Course
- Box Cricket Arena
- Sand Volleyball Court
- Volleyball Courts
- Kabaddi Court
- Croquet Pitch
- Indoor & Outdoor Gym

=== Sportx - Indoor Sports Complex ===
- Badminton Arena
- Table Tennis Lounge
- Chess Lounge
- Billiards Lounge
- Foosball & Air Hockey
- Life Fitness Gym
- Life Fitness Cardio Studio
- Pro Shop
- Zumba, Pilates & Yoga Lounge
- Squash Courts
- Spin Studio

@ fencing

=== R. A. C. E. ===
- 10 - Lane Track
- Long Jump
- High Jump
- Triple Jump
- Pole Vault
- Steeple Chase Water Jump
- Shotput
- Javelin
- Discus throw
- Hammer throw
- Basketball Court
- Volleyball Court
- Box Cricket Court
- Pickle Ball Court
