= Public Affairs Council =

American professional association

- Formation: 1954
- Founder: President Dwight D. Eisenhower
- Founded at: New York City
- Headquarters: Washington D.C.
- Website: http://www.pac.org

The Public Affairs Council (PAC) is an American professional association for people working in public administration and policy founded in 1954 by President Dwight D. Eisenhower. Its mission is to advance the field of public affairs and provide resources to public affairs executives and managers. Based in Washington, D.C., PAC counts over 600 corporations, associations and consulting firms as members.

== History ==
The Public Affairs Council was launched in 1954 by President Dwight D. Eisenhower, when he convened a meeting of business executives to suggest the creation of a national organization to make business people from both parties active participants in the political process. First incorporated as the Effective Citizens Organization (ECO) in Newark, New Jersey, the ECO relocated to New York City in 195XXXXXX and then to Washington DC in 1962. It changed its name to the Public Affairs Council in 1965.

In the 1950s, the concept of corporate public affairs was only beginning to come into vogue, and at the time meant mostly legislature watching and corporate community involvement. Today, the definition of "public affairs" is much broader, encompassing political involvement, lobbying (government relations), political action committees, corporate community involvement, issues management, grassroots advocacy, and public relations. This broadening of the field of public affairs and an increased understanding of the importance of political involvement has been demonstrated in the growth of formal corporate and association public affairs programs. In the 1950s, only a handful of companies had formal programs, today, thousands of companies and associations have them.

Since its founding, the expansion of the Public Affairs Council and its operations has mirrored the growth of the public affairs profession. In the beginning, the Council offered only a few limited services and a monthly newsletter, but today, the Public Affairs Council offers a comprehensive program of public affairs and government relations services, several monthly and annual publications, and dozens of annual conferences.

== Consulting services ==
Through the Consulting Services division, the Council advances the field of Public Affairs by collecting and analyzing data, assessing best practices, and providing professional assistance to member organizations in areas of strategic planning and management, organizational structure, performance measurement and evaluation.

The Consulting Services division carries out its mission through a mix of products and services available only to members of the Public Affairs Council, including individual consultation and technical assistance, applied research and consulting, books and publications, conferences and seminars.

== Publications ==
Beginning in 1958, the ECO launched its first newsletter, Echo. In 1974, the Public Affairs Council renamed the newsletter Impact, which is the name that it retains to this day. In addition to this monthly newsletter, the council, in conjunction with the Foundation for Public Affairs, produces numerous publications annually, including handbooks for public affairs professionals, benchmarking studies, and the Public Affairs Management Report series.

== Conferences ==
In 1964 the ECO offered its first series of conferences and roundtables, including the first Public Affairs Training Seminar (PATS). As the interrelationship between business and government became more complex, these conferences provided public affairs professionals with their first opportunities for learning about groundbreaking approaches to public affairs that were being developed. The Public Affairs Council now holds more than 100 conferences and workshops annually, including the largest national conferences on corporate and association grassroots, political action committees and corporate philanthropy.

== Governance ==
The Public Affairs Council is governed by a volunteer board of directors composed of industry leaders. The council's executive committee, which provides the day-to-day governance of programs and activities, is made up of 15 executives who have demonstrated support for the council as Members of the Board or Directors.

== See also ==
- Professional association
- Public administration
- Public policy
