= Nigerian British University =

Private university in Asa, Nigeria

- Motto: Developing Potentials, We Trust
- Type: Private
- Established: 2022
- Affiliations: Adorable Foundation for Educational Development
- Vice-Chancellor: Rev. Fr. Professor Innocent Ebere Uwah
- Location: Asa, Ukwa West, Abia State, Nigeria
- Government Approved: 2022
- Website: nbu.edu.ng

Nigerian British University is a private co-educational Nigerian university owned and operated by the Adorable Foundation for Educational Development (AFED) in Nigeria. The university is located in Asa, Abia State, Nigeria.

== History ==
Nigerian British University was established by the Adorable Foundation for Educational Development (AFED) to deliver global methods in education through the development of technology in teaching and learning experiences.

The university was approved by the National Universities Commission to operate as a Private University in Nigeria in April 2022 under the President Muhammadu Buhari administration.

The university was commissioned by Okezie Ikpeazu, the governor of Abia state in February, 2023. The governor further awarded scholarships to the first twenty students of the university.

The Pro-Chancellor/Chairman, Board of Trustees and Governing Council of Nigerian British University is Dr. Chukwuemeka Umeoji.

The School maintains a strict policy against cultism, drug abuse, and other anti-social behaviors.

== Programmes ==
- Faculty of Law
- Faculty of Computing and Information technology

The faculty houses the following departments: Department of Computer Science, Department of Information Technology, Department of Software Engineering, Department of Cyber Security, and Department of Data Science.

- College of Health Sciences

College of Health Sciences offers the following courses: Medicine & Surgery, Nursing Science, Medical Laboratory Science.

- Faculty of Engineering

The faculty houses the following departments: Electrical &Electronics Engineering, Mechatronics Engineering, Computer Engineering, Information & Communication Engineering.

- Faculty of Management and Social Sciences.

The faculty houses the following departments: Department of Business Administration, Department of Accounting, Department of Economics, Department of Finance and Banking, Department of Political Science and International Relations, Department of Hospitality, Department of Peace and Conflict Resolution, Department of Mass Communication, Department of Management and Tourism, Department of Entrepreneurship.

== Vice Chancellor ==
Rev. Fr. Prof. [Innocent Ebere Uwah] was appointed Ag. Vice Chancellor of the University on 12th December, 2025.
