= Economy of Queensland =

- Currency: Australian Dollar (A$ or AUD)
- Fiscal year: 1 July – 30 June

Statistics
- GDP: A$510.7 billion (2023–24)
- GDP growth: 2.1%
- Inflation (CPI): 2.5% (2013)
- Labour force: 2,313,800 (2010-11)
- Labour force by occupation: Retail trade (11.7%), Construction (11%), Health care & social assistance (10.1%), Manufacturing (8.5%), Education & training (7.6%)
- Unemployment: 6.2% (2018)
- Main industries: Mining, tourism, agriculture, financial services

External
- Exports: A$134.7 billion (2023–24)
- Export goods: Coal (A$58.2 billion); Natural gas (n.p.); Beef (A$6.7 billion); Aluminum ore (A$3.2 billion); Copper (A$2.4 billion)
- Main export partners: China (21.3%); Japan (14.5%); India (13.6%); Korea Republic (12.0%); Vietnam (3.8%)
- Imports: A$101.6 billion (2023–24)
- Import goods: Refined petroleum (A$10.2 billion); Passenger vehicles (A$7.9 billion); Crude petroleum (A$4.8 billion); Goods vehicles (A$4.8 billion); Gold (A$2.9 billion)
- Main import partners: China (20.9%); United States (10.9%); Korea Republic (10.2%); Japan (8.8%); Thailand (5.9%)

Public finance
- Credit rating: AA+ (S&P); Aa1 (Moody's)
- All values, unless otherwise stated, are in US dollars.

The economy of Queensland is the third largest economy within Australia. Queensland generated 19.5% of Australia's gross domestic product in the 2008–09 financial year. The economy is primarily built upon mining, agriculture, tourism and financial services. Queensland's main exports are coal, metals, meat and sugar.

Western Australia and Queensland are often referred to as the "resource states" because their economies are currently dependent on exports of resources such as coal, iron ore and natural gas. However, of the two states, Queensland has a more diversified base. In 2006, exports from Queensland totaled A$49.4 billion. By 2009 this figure had grown to A$65.5 billion.

Brisbane is categorised as a global city, and is among Asia-Pacific cities with largest GDPs. It has strengths in mining, banking, insurance, transportation, information technology, real estate and food. Some of the largest companies headquartered in Brisbane, all among Australia's largest, include Suncorp Group, Virgin Australia, Aurizon, Bank of Queensland, Flight Centre, CUA, Sunsuper, QSuper, Domino's Pizza Enterprises, Star Entertainment Group, ALS, TechnologyOne, NEXTDC, Super Retail Group, New Hope Coal, Jumbo Interactive, National Storage, Collins Foods and Boeing Australia.

In 2018, there were 134,312 international students enrolled in the state, largely focused on Brisbane. Most of the state's international students are from Asia.

== Agriculture ==
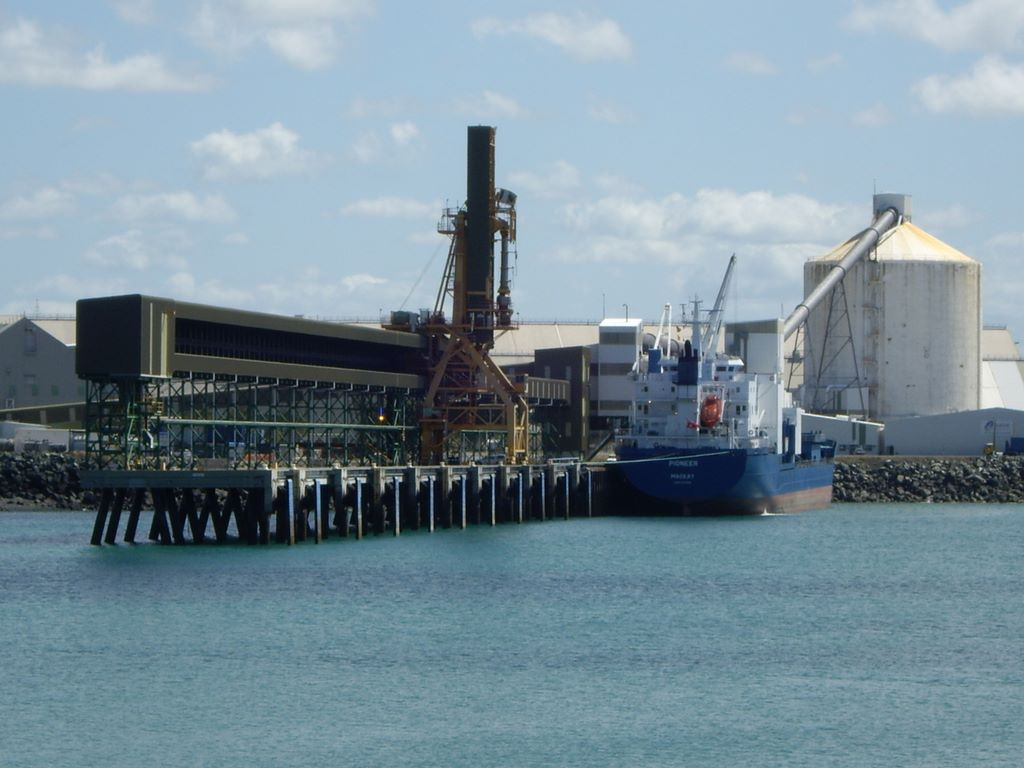
A bulk sugar terminal at Mackay

In 2011, the Australian Bureau of Statistics recorded a total of 28,435 farms covering 81% of the state. Sugar cane is harvested in coastal areas from Far North Queensland to the southern border and is the state's biggest rural commodity. Queensland produces 94% of Australia's total raw sugar production. Customers in the Asia-Pacific region can be supplied all year round through the use of storage facilities at bulk port terminals. Most of the state's sugar crop is marketed through Queensland Sugar, which until 2006 compulsorily acquired all sugar grown in the state under a single desk arrangement.

Cattle grazing for beef and sheep grazing for wool production are spread across inland areas. Wheat is grown in the Darling Downs region, an area that has seen mining activities expand. This has produced a boom in construction work for the region despite the global downturn but created conflict between farmers and mining companies. The Lockyer Valley is a significant horticultural region, although persistent drought is forcing the local economy to diversify. Farms around the coastal town of Bowen produce Australia's largest winter crop of vegetables. Other major crops produced in Queensland include bananas, cotton and citrus crops. Southern coastal regions include mixed forestry and farming land uses.

== Mining ==
Map of Queensland's major mineral, coal and petroleum operations and resources, 2019

In the 2006–07 financial year mining contributed 9% of Queensland's gross state product (GSP). Queensland has significant coal, coal seam gas and bauxite deposits and some oil shale and natural gas reserves. Coal production in the 2008–09 financial year totalled 159 million tonnes leading to exports to 38 countries. Queensland exports half the world's coking coal which is used to make steel.

Minerals including copper, lead, silver, zinc, bauxite, gold, phosphate rock, magnesite and silica sand are mined in the state. Dimension stone, that is, stone that can be cut for domestic use, including granite, marble, sandstone and slate are produced in various locations across the state.

Queensland has the largest onshore oil and gas potential in the country as the state is relatively under-explored. Oil was discovered in the south west of the state in the early 1980s, leading to the construction of an oil pipeline from the Cooper Basin and Eromanga Basins to Brisbane. A series of gas pipelines, which began operating in the late 1990s, connects users in Mount Isa and Brisbane to the south west.

Gemstones such as sapphire, opal and chrysoprase are also mined in commercial quantities. In the 2008–09 financial year Queensland collected A$3 billion in mining royalties.

Dragline at the Curragh coal mine

=== Coal seam gas ===
Despite being positioned under prime agricultural land the Bowen Basin and Surat Basin are becoming intensively developed by the mining industry as Queensland's coal seam gas industry booms. In the ten from 2000, about 1200 wells have been sunk in the western Darling Downs, with that figure set to rise to 20 000 over the following decade. In 2010, coal seam gas was generating 30% of the state's electricity. Several international energy companies are investing in multibillion-dollar projects to convert the coal seam gas to liquified natural gas and export it via the Port of Gladstone. Landowners have raised concerns with the mining development ranging from a lack of compensation, property access, construction of gravel roads on farming land, water runoff from drill sites and the potential problems from the millions of tonnes of salt that will be brought to the surface each year.

=== Refineries ===
One of the largest alumina refineries in the world, Queensland Alumina, was built at Gladstone in 1967. Bauxite for the refinery is transported from Weipa to Gladstone via sea. Also located here is Australia's largest aluminium smelter, Boyne Smelters. Bulwer Island Refinery was the state's largest oil refinery, owned by BP, at Bulwer Island in Brisbane until it was converted to an import terminal. Near Townsville is a major nickel and cobalt refinery known as Queensland Nickel.

=== Ports ===
Until an extensive rail network developed in the state early industries depended on seaports to get their products to market. The largest ports in Queensland are the Port of Gladstone, followed by the Port of Brisbane and then the Port of Townsville. Some Central Queensland ports have experienced significant backlogs in recent years. For example, in 2007 there were 50 ships waiting off the coast to be loaded. In 2008, the federal government provided Queensland an extra $20 billion for major capital works to address port and rail infrastructure shortcomings.

== State budget ==
Financial year	GSP growth rate (%)	Average unemployment rate (%)
2004–05	4.0	4.9
2005–06	4.5	5.0
2006–07	6.8	4.0
2007–08	5.1	3.7
2008–09	1.1	4.4
2009–10	2.2	5.7
2010–11	0.2	5.5
2011–12	4.0	5.5
2012–13	3.5	6.0

The Queensland Treasury is the state government department that devises economic and financial policy advice, prepares the state budget, organises revenue collection and provides statistical research. Economic policy priorities for Queensland are to develop a diverse economy, to create more jobs and to manage both urban growth and develop Queensland's regions.

Queensland is predicted to be in deficit until the 2015–16 budget. The deficit has been partly caused by decreases in the prices for both coking coal and thermal coal. Declining GST revenue is another cause that is partly attributed to the deficit. Strong population growth and the demands this has placed on infrastructure spending as well as reductions in mining royalties have also strained recent state budgets, resulting in the loss of the state's AAA credit rating. Poor planning including the canceled Traveston Crossing Dam and cost blowouts in the budgets for the Gold Coast desalination plant, Wyaralong Dam, Tugun Bypass and Airport Link projects has not helped the bottom line.

In 2009, Queensland Premier Anna Bligh announced plans for the privatisation of a number of government owned assets including Queensland Motorways, Queensland Rail's coal rail business QR National, the Port of Brisbane, the Abbot Point coal terminal and Queensland Forestry Plantations. The asset sale is expected to raise A$15 billion. There has been widespread public criticism of the sell-off which has led to slump in the Premier's popularity. Unions and economists criticised the plans as unjustified and poorly timed.

=== Taxation ===
Historically Queensland has been viewed as the lowest-taxing state. Queensland has slid to third place behind Victoria and Western Australia in a comparison of taxation competitiveness between other states and territories. A measure of tax per capita from 2002 to 2007 has seen the figure rise 70%, from $1,321 up to $2,226, per person. Payroll tax, which is payable when an employer's total annual wage payout is greater than A$1 million and has been described as "crippling" by some businesses, accounted for 26% of Queensland government tax revenue in the 2007–08 fiscal year.

== Tourism ==
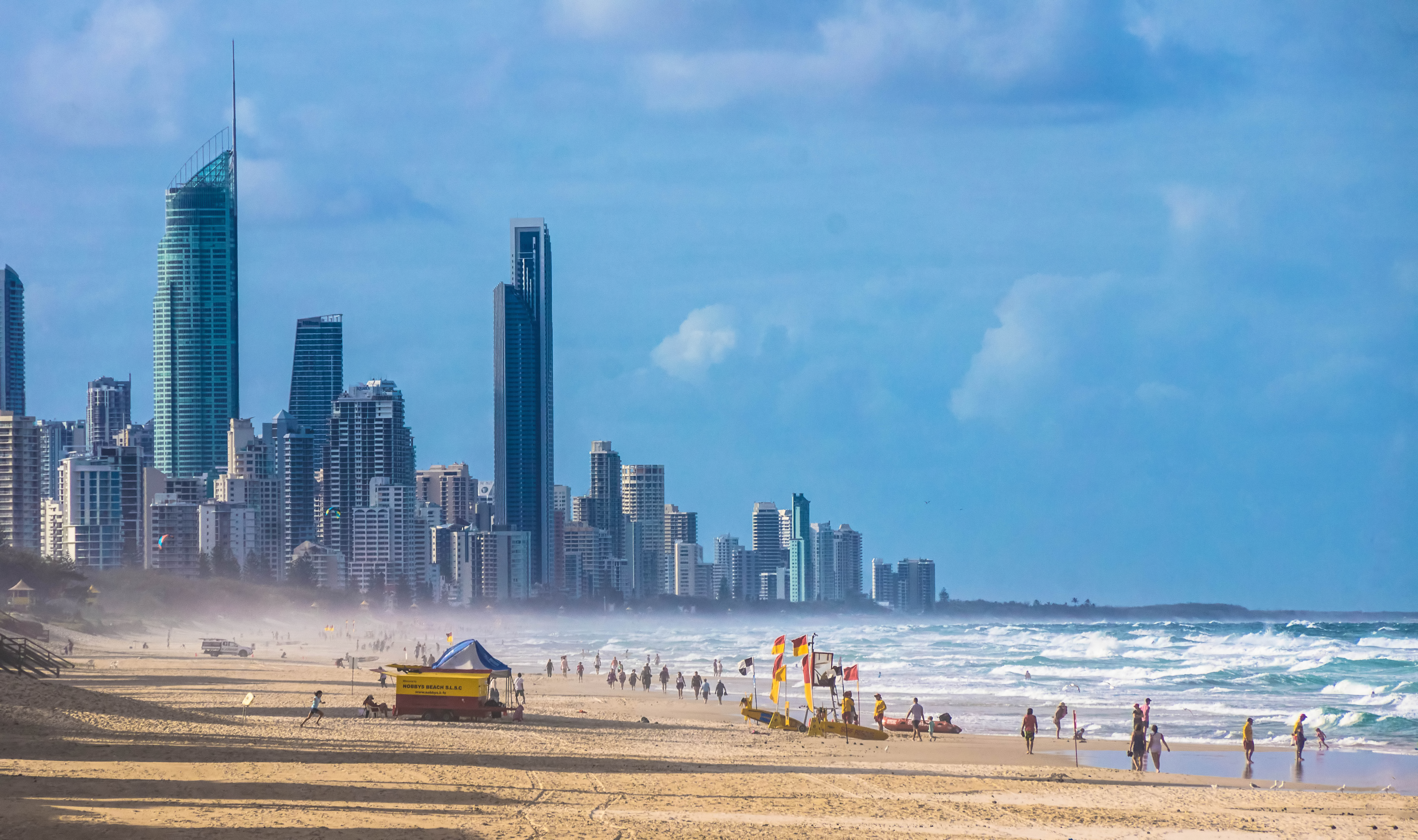
The Gold Coast, Queensland's second-largest city and a major tourist destination

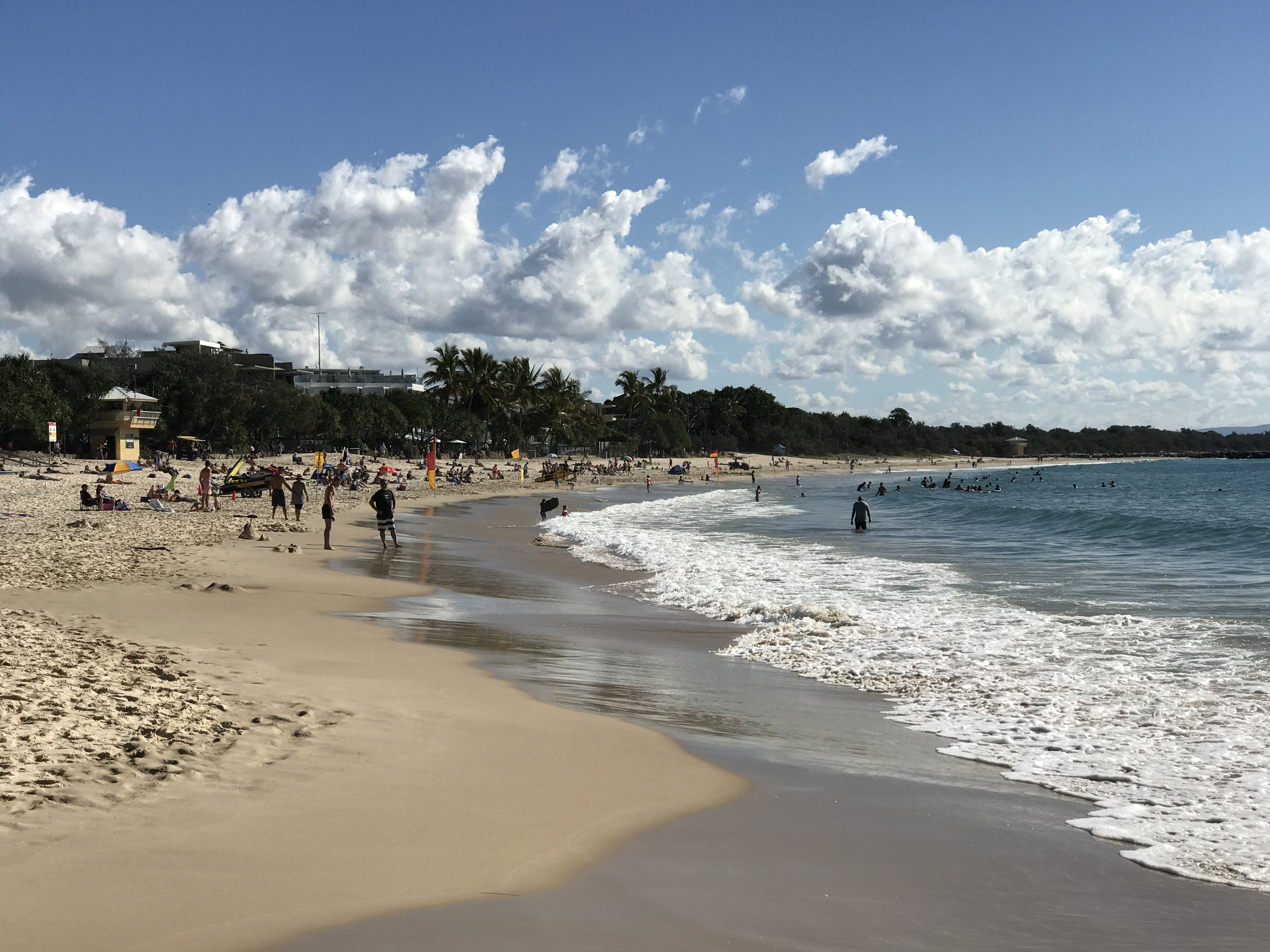
Noosa Heads on the Sunshine Coast, Queensland's third largest city and a major tourist destination

The tourism industry plays a key role in the economies of regional areas and supports thousands of small businesses. Queensland experiences the second highest volume of tourists after New South Wales. Foreign backpackers and students on working holiday visas make up a large proportion of international visitors. The tourism industry in Queensland employs 5.7% of the workforce, or about 119,000 people and accounts for 4.5% of the state's GSP, directly generating A$$8.8 billion to the state's economy. Tourism Queensland is the government agency responsible for the development of the state's tourist industry.

As a result of its many varied landscapes, warm climate and abundant natural beauty, tourism is Queensland's leading tertiary industry with millions of interstate and international visitors visiting the state each year. The industry generates $8.8 billion annually, accounting for 4.5% of Queensland's Gross State Product. It has an annual export of $4.0 billion annually. The sector directly employs about 5.7% of Queensland citizens. Accommodation in Queensland caters for nearly 22% of the total expenditure, followed by restaurants/meals (15%), airfares (11%), fuel (11%) and shopping/gifts (11%).

The most visited tourist destinations of Queensland include Brisbane (including Moreton and South Stradbroke islands), the Gold Coast, the Sunshine Coast, the Great Barrier Reef, Cairns, Port Douglas, the Daintree Rainforest, Fraser Island and the Whitsunday Islands.

Brisbane is the third most popular destination in Australia following Sydney and Melbourne. Major attractions in its metropolitan area include South Bank Parklands, the Queensland Cultural Centre (including the Queensland Museum, Queensland Art Gallery, Gallery of Modern Art, Queensland Performing Arts Centre and State Library of Queensland), City Hall, the Story Bridge, the Howard Smith Wharves, ANZAC Square, St John's Cathedral, Fortitude Valley (including James Street and Chinatown), West End, the Teneriffe woolstores precinct, the Brisbane River and its Riverwalk network, the City Botanic Gardens, Roma Street Parkland, New Farm Park (including the Brisbane Powerhouse), the Kangaroo Point Cliffs and park, the Lone Pine Koala Sanctuary, the Mount Coot-tha Reserve (including Mount Coot-tha Lookout and Mount Coot-tha Botanic Gardens), the D'Aguilar Range and National Park, as well as Moreton Bay (including Moreton, North Stradbroke and Bribie islands, and coastal suburbs such as Shorncliffe, Wynnum and those on the Redcliffe Peninsula).

The Gold Coast is home to numerous popular surf beaches such as those at Surfers Paradise and Burleigh Heads. It also includes the largest concentration of amusement parks in Australia, including Dreamworld, Movie World, Sea World, Wet 'n' Wild and WhiteWater World, as well as the Currumbin Wildlife Sanctuary. The Gold Coast's hinterland includes Lamington National Park in the McPherson Range.

The Sunshine Coast includes popular surfing and beach destinations including Noosa Heads and Mooloolaba. It is also home to UnderWater World and Steve Irwin's Australia Zoo. Its hinterland includes the Glass House Mountains National Park.

Cairns is renowned as the gateway to the Great Barrier Reef, Far North Queensland (including Port Douglas) and the Daintree Rainforest.

The Whitsunday Islands off the coast of North Queensland are a popular tourist destinations for their resort facilities, access to the Great Barrier Reef and natural beauty.

== Labour market ==
Although there was a rise in the number of unemployed people, the labour market expanded 2.2% in the 2008–09 financial year. The Queensland labour market was hit by skilled labour shortages in 2007. A lack of people completing apprenticeships in the construction industry is a current concern. The problem is particularly acute because the state is already dealing with an inadequate supply of new housing to cope with its population growth. In the past there have been shortages of doctors, nurses, teachers as well as shortages in the agriculture and hospitality sectors. A lack of university places is another factor limiting that is affecting the availability of skilled labour in some regions.

== Household income ==
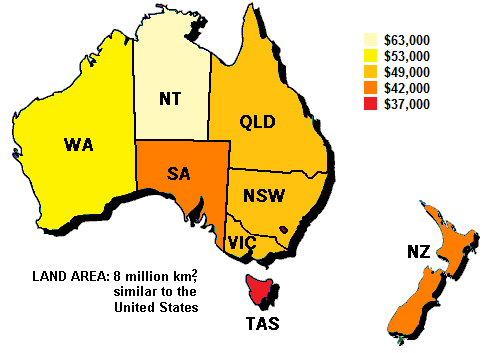
2007 median household incomes

The average weekly earnings for a full-time adult person in Queensland in 2009 was $1,177.00. While Queensland generally does not have high cost of living, housing is expensive compared to other states. Housing in Queensland is the least affordable of any state or territory. The average Queensland homeowner had to pay 40.5% of their household income towards home loan repayments and tenants on average paid 26.5% for rent during the first quarter of 2008. Average wages rose by 7.5% in 2009, three times the national inflation rate.

== Economic history ==
=== 19th century ===
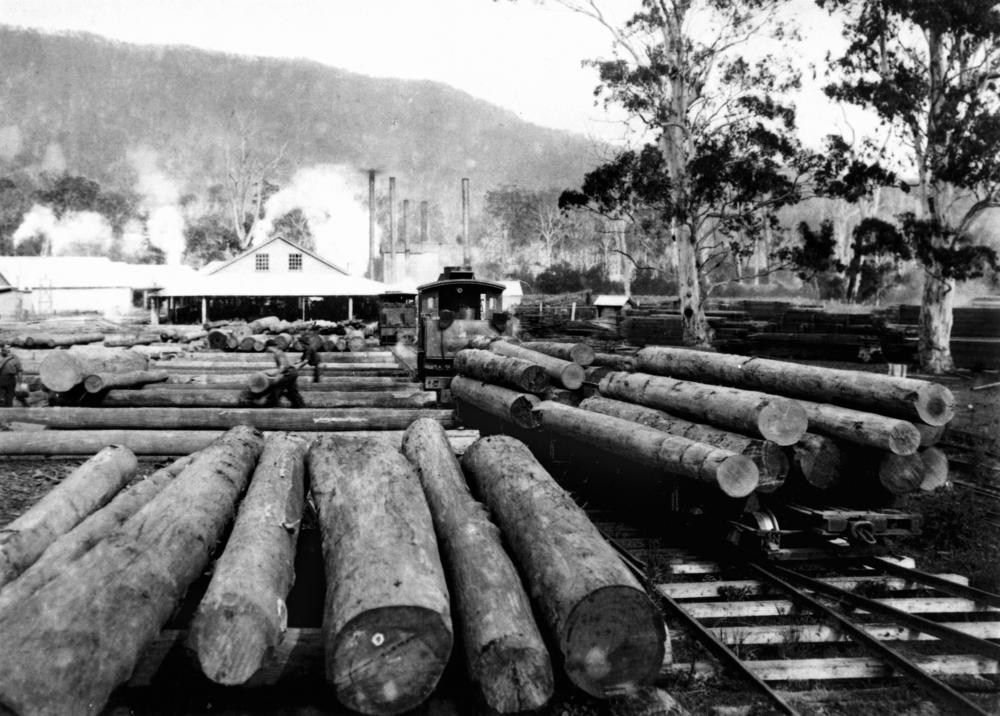
Sawmills like this one at Canungra provided employment for many rural communities in the early years of Queensland's development.

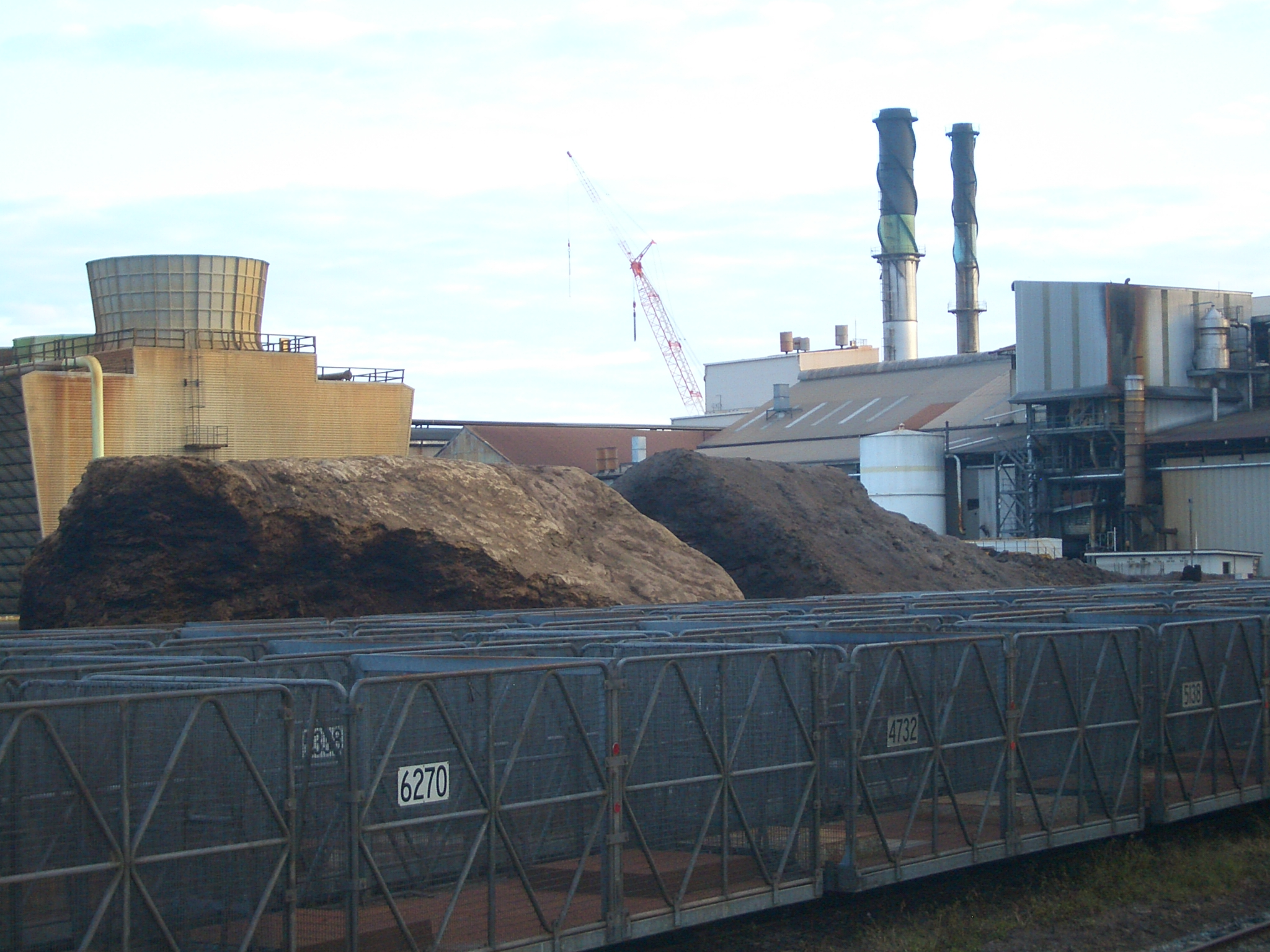
The Proserpine Central Sugar Mill, established in 1897

One of the first industries to spread across the state was pastoralism. Starting in the Darling Downs in the 1840s, squatters and pioneering families established cattle stations up until the 1870s, as far north as the Gulf Country. The early settlers of Queensland faced many problems, including a lack of labour, a lack of transport facilities to markets, attacks by Aboriginals, a climate that was too wet, drought and falling commodity-prices. An Australia-wide trend towards recession hit Queensland particularly hard from July 1866. Immigration faltered, unemployment rose and business activity contracted. It was not long before gold discoveries signaled a turnaround in Queensland's economic activity.

Gold was discovered in the state in 1861 at Peak Downs near Clermont and in 1867 at Gympie. Many gold miners left the Victorian goldfields in the 1870s - surface gold had become scarce in that state - and moved to Queensland to try their luck. During the American Civil War (1861–1865) a shortage of cotton in Europe caused a cotton boom in Queensland. Copper was discovered at Cloncurry in 1869.

In 1863 the first sugar-cane plantation was established and the first South Sea Islanders, referred to as kanakas, arrived, providing cheap labour - compare blackbirding. The sugar-cane industry expanded northwards along the coast with a plantation and mill operating at Innisfail in 1881 and in the following year a mill opened in Bundaberg. By 1890 developments in refrigeration technologies had opened new markets for types of produce which would previously have spoiled on the two-month-long journey to England.

During the early 1880s the Dingo Fence was constructed to protect livestock in south-east Australia. It protected southern Queensland, aiming to stop attacks on sheep from Australia's native dog. The fence was maintained up until the 1970s. As of 2009 experts estimated that $60 million in losses occurs annually in Queensland due to dingoes that have penetrated the barrier. In 1886 the introduced rabbit crossed into southern Queensland, causing yields from pasture production to decrease. The rabbit also contributed to soil erosion through overgrazing.

=== 20th century ===
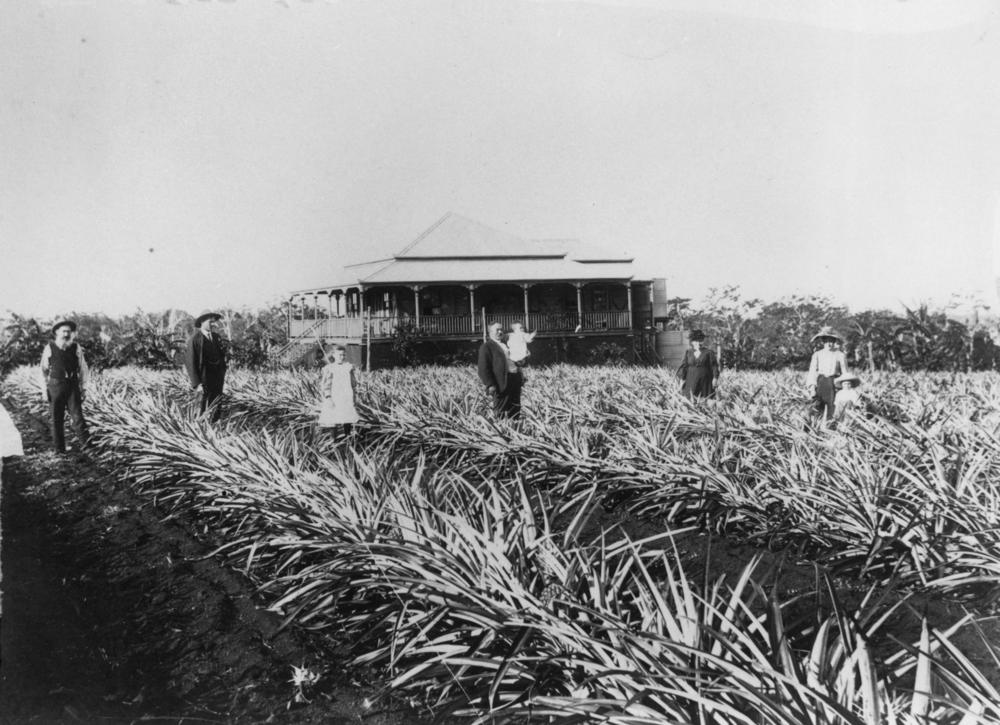
Pineapple plantation at Cleveland, 1907. Much of Australia's tropical fruit is cultivated within the state.

A drought in 1902 drastically reduced agricultural productivity. By 1906, maize covered 25%, sugar cane 23.8% and wheat 20.5% of cropping land in the state. In 1908, 700 bores were supplying artesian basin water to western Queensland, transforming an otherwise mostly arid landscape into a more productive area. Refrigeration and regular steamer services between Brisbane and London allowed Queensland to become Australia's largest exporter of meat in the same year. The Franco-British Exhibition of 1908 was a good opportunity for Queensland to promote itself, particularly the desirable climate and expanses of fertile land. Tourism was promoted under the banner of "the Winter Paradise of the Southern Hemisphere". A souvenir guide from the show boasted that Queensland cultivated the richest of fruits including pineapples, bananas, mangoes, grapes and citrus fruit.

Australia's largest airline, Qantas was founded as Queensland and Northern Territory Aerial Services in Winton in 1920. Silver, copper and lead were being mined from Mount Isa by 1925. Wool became an important export for Queensland during the early 20th century, contributing to half of the state's total exports by 1930. The 1950s saw a resurgence of whaling in Australia. A new whaling station was set up at Tangalooma on Moreton Island to process slaughtered whales. In 1963 the world's richest deposit of bauxite was discovered at Weipa. Dairying, once an important local industry in the state, declined towards the end of the 20th century. The Queensland economy last contracted during the 1990–91 financial year at a rate of -0.7%.

=== 21st century ===
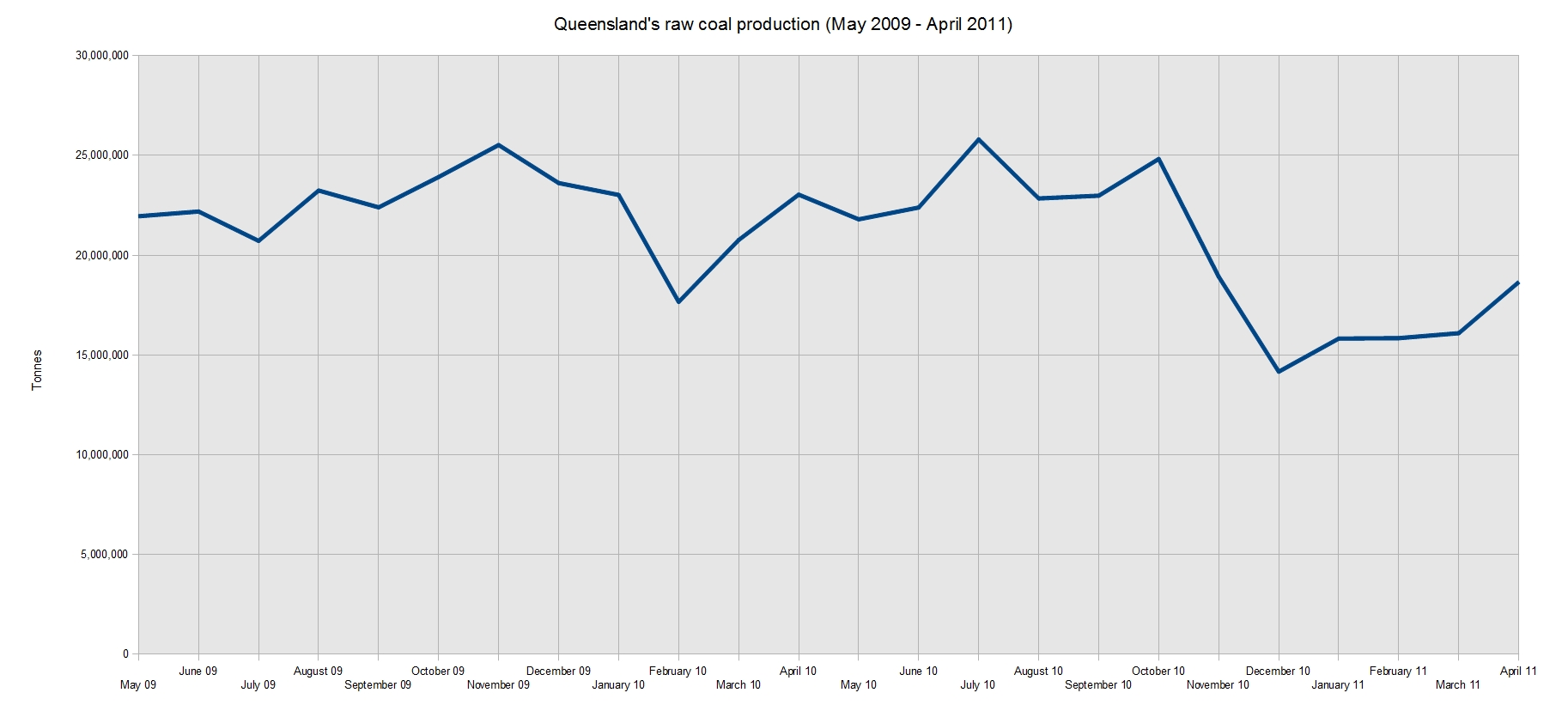
Widespread flooding reduced coal production in December 2010 by more than one third.

In 2004, a citrus canker outbreak forced farmers to destroy every citrus tree in the Emerald region. This amounted to half a million commercial trees being destroyed during an eradication program that lasted five years. The banana industry was devastated in 2006 from the flooding and crop destruction left in the wake of Cyclone Larry. 90% of the country's banana crop was destroyed. The price of bananas doubled to A$6 a kilogram as a result. In the 2006–07 financial year, the nominal value of the Queensland economy surpassed A$200 billion for the first time. In early 2009, Queensland's credit rating was downgraded by rating agency Standard & Poor's to AA+ after the state's budget deficit increased to more than A$1.5 billion.

== See also ==
- South East Queensland Infrastructure Plan and Program
