= Brisbane Administration Centre =

Coordinates: 27°28′09.07″S 153°01′21.88″E

Northbank Plaza
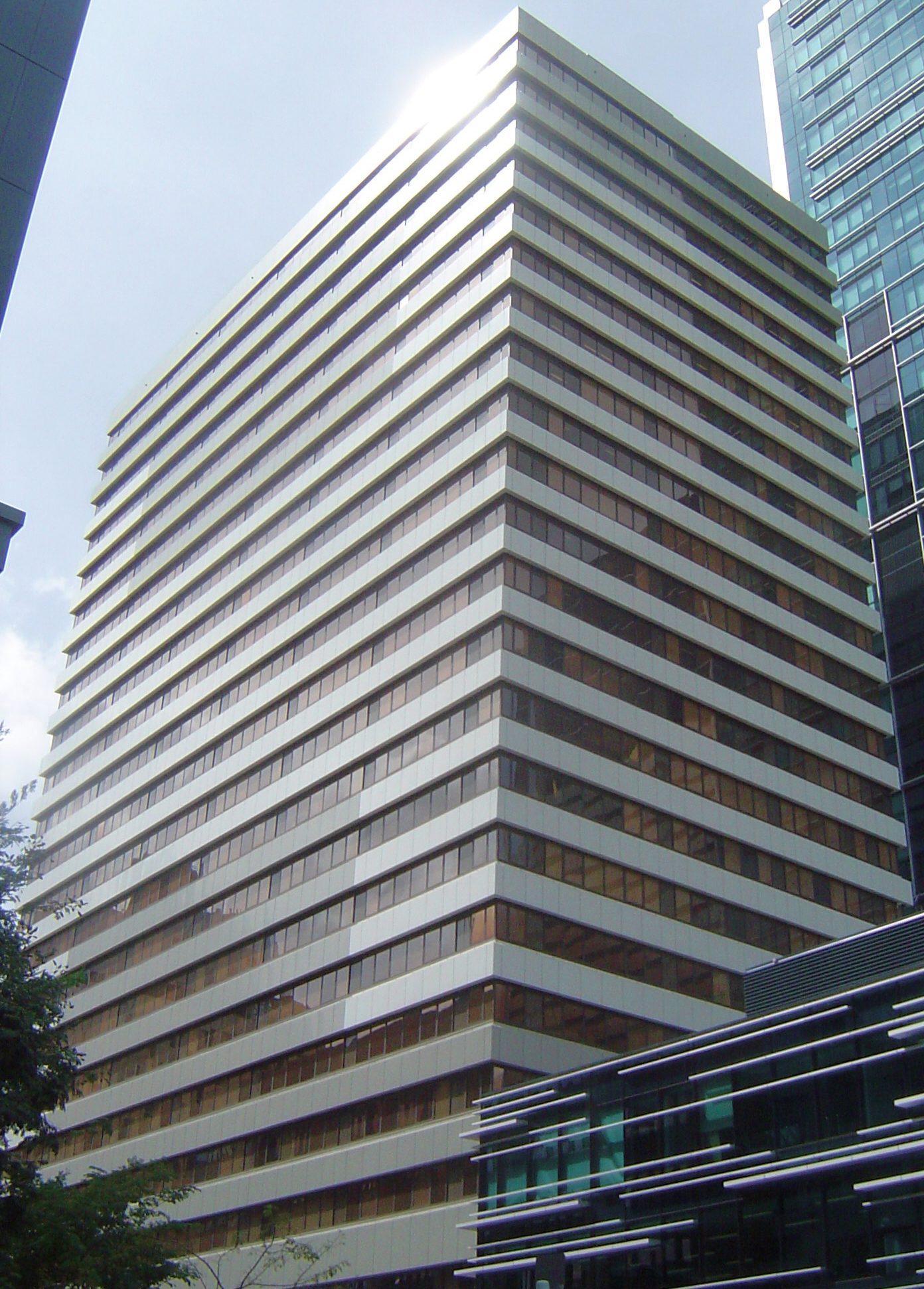
- Northbank Plaza, 2010
- Former names: Brisbane Administration Centre

General information
- Type: Office
- Location: Brisbane
- Construction started: 1975
- Owner: Regus
- Landlord: Charter Hall

Technical details
- Floor count: 22
- Floor area: 26,736m²

Northbank Plaza is an office building in Brisbane, Queensland, Australia. Located at 69 Ann Street in the central business district, it is located immediately south of the Brisbane City Hall. Until 2007 it was known as the Brisbane Administration Centre (BAC), and served as the administrative headquarters for the Brisbane City Council.

When originally opened in the 1930s the Brisbane City Hall was intended to house all of the council's office staff, as well as councillors, together with public meeting rooms. However, as Brisbane rapidly grew, the council converted many of the smaller public meeting rooms and vestibules to office space. Eventually by the 1960s offices were being built on the roof and in the basement of the city hall. Some council departments, such as the Transport Department, and part of the Health Department could not fit into City Hall and were located elsewhere.

During the tenure of Lord Mayor Clem Jones (1961–1974) properties were acquired south of the City Hall with the intention of constructing a large office tower to replace the cramped conditions then prevailing in City Hall. The BAC was opened in 1975, together with a shopping plaza below street level. For many years the shopping centre struggled, owing to its awkward layout and dark interior. The plaza was completely revamped in the early 1990s, the shops were relocated to street level and their former location being taken over by a new public library.

The relocation of most council offices from City Hall to the BAC allowed the council to restore the City Hall's meeting rooms and vestibules to their original purpose and to undertake a thorough restoration of the building. This was largely completed by the mid-1980s. An underground public car park is also located beneath the building.

In 2006 the city council moved its offices to another high rise office block Brisbane Square, located on Queen Street. In 2007–08 the building underwent a $30 million upgrade and was subsequently renamed Northbank Plaza. The building supports 26,000m^{2} of office space over twenty-two levels, with the ground floor used as both a lobby and a small retail area. The tenants of Northbank Plaza are Telstra, RemServ, Interleasing (Australia), Brisbane City Council, Berril & Watson Lawyers, the Regus Group of Companies, Brisbane Economic Development Agency, Bennett & Philp Lawyers, Australia Post and Queensland Corrective Services.

== See also ==
- List of tallest buildings in Brisbane
