= Collins Street =

Collins Street or Collins St. may refer to:

== Structures ==
=== Places of worship ===
- Collins Street Baptist Church, a church in Melbourne, Australia
- Collins Street Independent Church, a church in Melbourne, Australia

=== Skyscrapers ===
- 101 Collins Street, a skyscraper in Melbourne, Australia
- 120 Collins Street, a skyscraper in Melbourne, Australia
- 555 Collins Street, a skyscraper in Melbourne, Australia
- 568 Collins Street, a skyscraper in Melbourne, Australia

== Thoroughfares ==
- Collins Street, Hobart, a street in Hobart, Australia
- Collins Street, Melbourne, a street in Melbourne, Australia
- Little Collins Street, a street in Melbourne, Australia

== Other ==
- Collins St., 5 pm, a painting by John Brack
