= The Ride to Conquer Cancer =

Canadian charity fundraising event

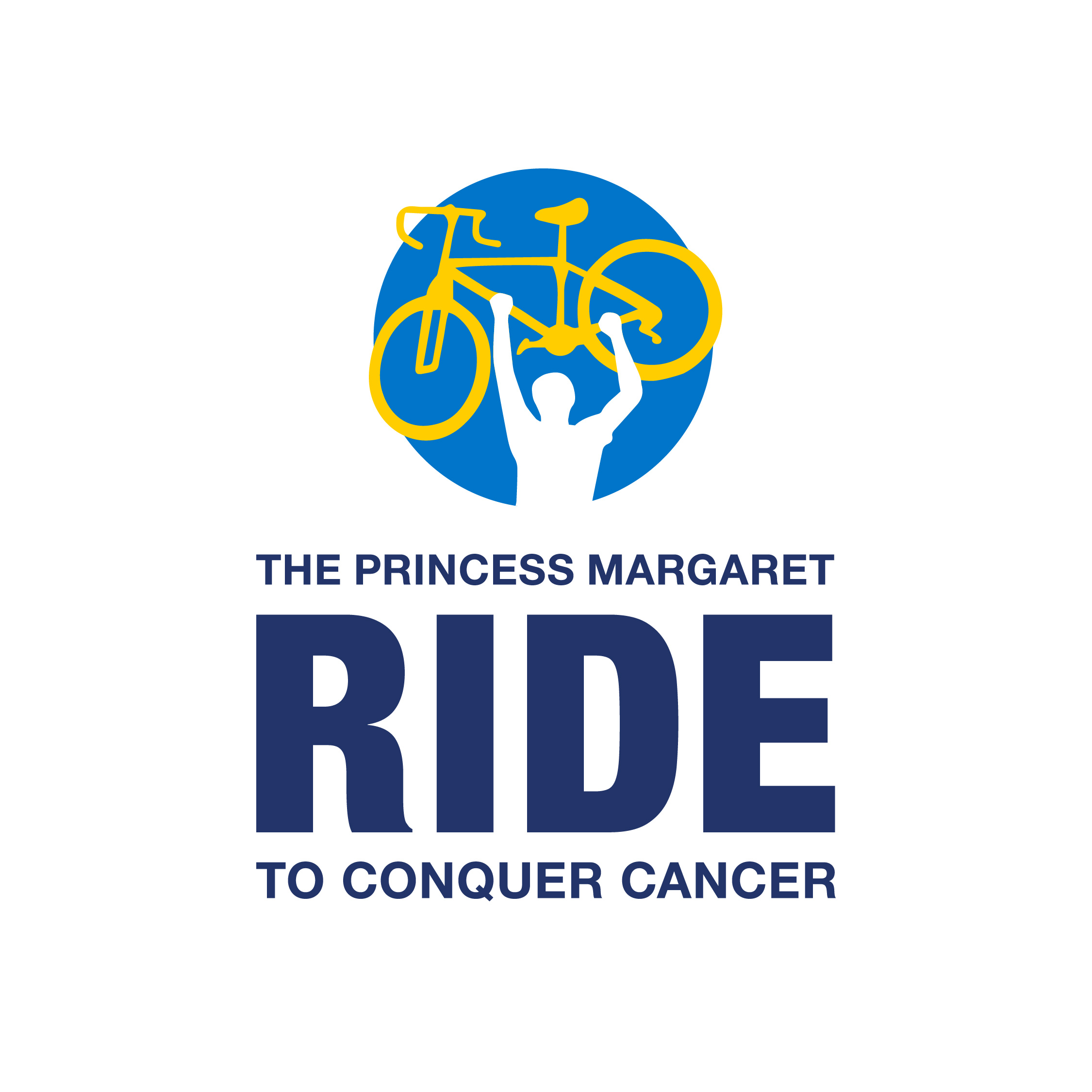
- Frequency: Annually
- Inaugurated: 2008
- Founder: Princess Margaret Cancer Foundation

The Princess Margaret Cancer Foundation launched the Ride to Conquer Cancer in 2008 as a mega-event fundraiser in support of cancer research and care at Princess Margaret Cancer Centre, located in Ontario, Canada. The Ride is a non-competitive cycling adventure that sees thousands of riders travel more than 200 kilometres from Toronto to Niagara over two days.

Throughout the 17-year history of the Ride, more than $300 million has been raised in Ontario and $550 million across Canada. The minimum fundraising amount required to participate in the event varies based on the chosen route with goals ranging from $2,000 to $4,000.

Funds raised support the world-class research and care underway at The Princess Margaret with advancements benefitting patients across Canada and around the world. The Ride was recognized as the number one peer-to-peer fundraising event in Canada from 2014 to 2019.

In 2020, due to the COVID-19 pandemic, the event was cancelled in Montréal, Québec and postponed in Vancouver, British Columbia. In Ontario and Alberta, the Ride pivoted to a virtual experience where the fundraising minimum and registration fee were waived, and riders chose their own route and distance to cycle.

Participants come from 10 provinces and two territories in Canada, 17 states in the United States, and six countries.

The Ride to Conquer Cancer event was licensed to cancer charities in Montréal, Calgary, and Vancouver following the initial success of the first Ride in 2008, as the inaugural event raised $14 million for The Princess Margaret. Importantly, 100% of the License Fees went back into a national collaborative clinical trials initiative. The previous Canadian charity partners are no longer associated with the Ride as they have launched their own cycling fundraisers.

The original event agency that supported the Canadian edition of the Ride to Conquer Cancer took the program to Australia in 2011, where the event took place for four years.

== Organization ==
The Princess Margaret Cancer Centre is one of the top 5 cancer research centres in the world. With over 3,700 employees, and the largest roster of cancer surgeons in Canada, over 200 types of cancer are treated at The Princess Margaret. In 2022, the Cancer Centre saw over 18,000 new patients. Among the services provided in 2022, it delivered 5,437 surgical procedures, 75,600 radiation therapy visits, 51,619 systemic therapy and transfusion visits, and 487 stem cell transplants. The clinical trials program also continues to grow in volume and breadth with 8,795 participants in research studies.

The Princess Margaret Cancer Centre conducts research, provides education, and delivers care in medical, surgical, and radiation oncology. Its activities include the adoption of emerging technologies and clinical practices in cancer treatment.

=== Ontario ===
The Ride is an epic two-day cycling event where thousands of participants from across Canada and around the world gather to ride over 200 kilometres from Toronto to Niagara Falls. Cyclists seek the support of their network of friends, family, and co-workers to fundraise for the event. Since 2008, the Ontario Ride has raised more than $300 million for cancer research and care.

From 2010 to 2021, Enbridge was the title sponsor for the Ride to Conquer Cancer. In 2025, Johnson & Johnson was announced as the presenting sponsor.

Steve’s Cyclepaths is the top fundraising team, typically raising more than $1 million each year. Over the past 17 years, the team has raised over $13 million for cancer research and care.

Each year, the Ontario Ride has hundreds of cancer survivors who take part. These riders affix a yellow flag on their bike to denote their journey with cancer, and they are celebrated by the Ride community throughout the event.

=== British Columbia ===
The British Columbia Ride commences in Vancouver with riders crossing into the United States to finish in Seattle, Washington. Nearly 2,642 riders raised $10.4 million in 2013 for the BC Cancer Foundation. In 2018, the event changed its destination to Hope, British Columbia instead of Seattle. Due to smoke from forest fires, the Ride could not reach Hope and instead a loop was created with the riders returning to the City of Chilliwack in B.C. on the Sunday. In 2019, riders were able to make it to Hope. In 2018, 2,100 riders participated and raised $9.1 million. Over eleven years, the B.C. Ride has raised more than $105.1 million.

=== Alberta ===
The Alberta Ride originates at Spruce Meadows in Calgary and heads southwest to Chain Lakes Provincial Park in the foothills of the Rocky Mountains before returning to Calgary. In 2013, 1,655 riders raised $7.5 million in support of the Alberta Cancer Foundation.

=== Quebec ===
Starting in Montréal and finishing in Québec City, the Ride supports Sir Mortimer B. Davis Jewish General Hospital in Montréal. In 2013, 1,778 riders raised $6.3 million through the Ride.

== Australia ==
The event went international as the Rio Tinto Ride to Conquer Cancer, taking place in Brisbane in August 2011 and 2012. The event has raised nearly $10 million for cancer research at the Queensland Institute of Medical Research, one of the largest research institutes in Australia.

Rides also now take place annually in Perth, Sydney, and Melbourne.

In 2013, the Brisbane Ride, sponsored by Rio Tinto, had 1,236 participating riders and raised $4.2 million for QIMR Berghofer Medical Research Institute. The Ride originated from Brisbane, breaking in Lake Wivenhoe, and returned to Brisbane.

The Melbourne Ride originated from Victoria in 2013 with 1,223 participating riders raising $4.3 million for the Peter MacCallum Cancer Centre.

The Perth Ride, sponsored by Sunsuper, had 1,336 riders in 2013 and raised $5.2 million for Harry Perkins Institute of Medical Research (formerly Western Australian Institute for Medical Research).

The Sydney Ride, sponsored by Sunsuper, had 1,034 participating riders in 2013, raising $4.1 million for the Chris O'Brien Lifehouse.

== New Zealand ==
2013 was the first year of The Ride to Conquer Cancer benefiting Cancer Society Auckland. 663 riders raised $2.1 million.
