= Brisbane Square Tower 2 =

Proposed office building in Brisbane, Queensland

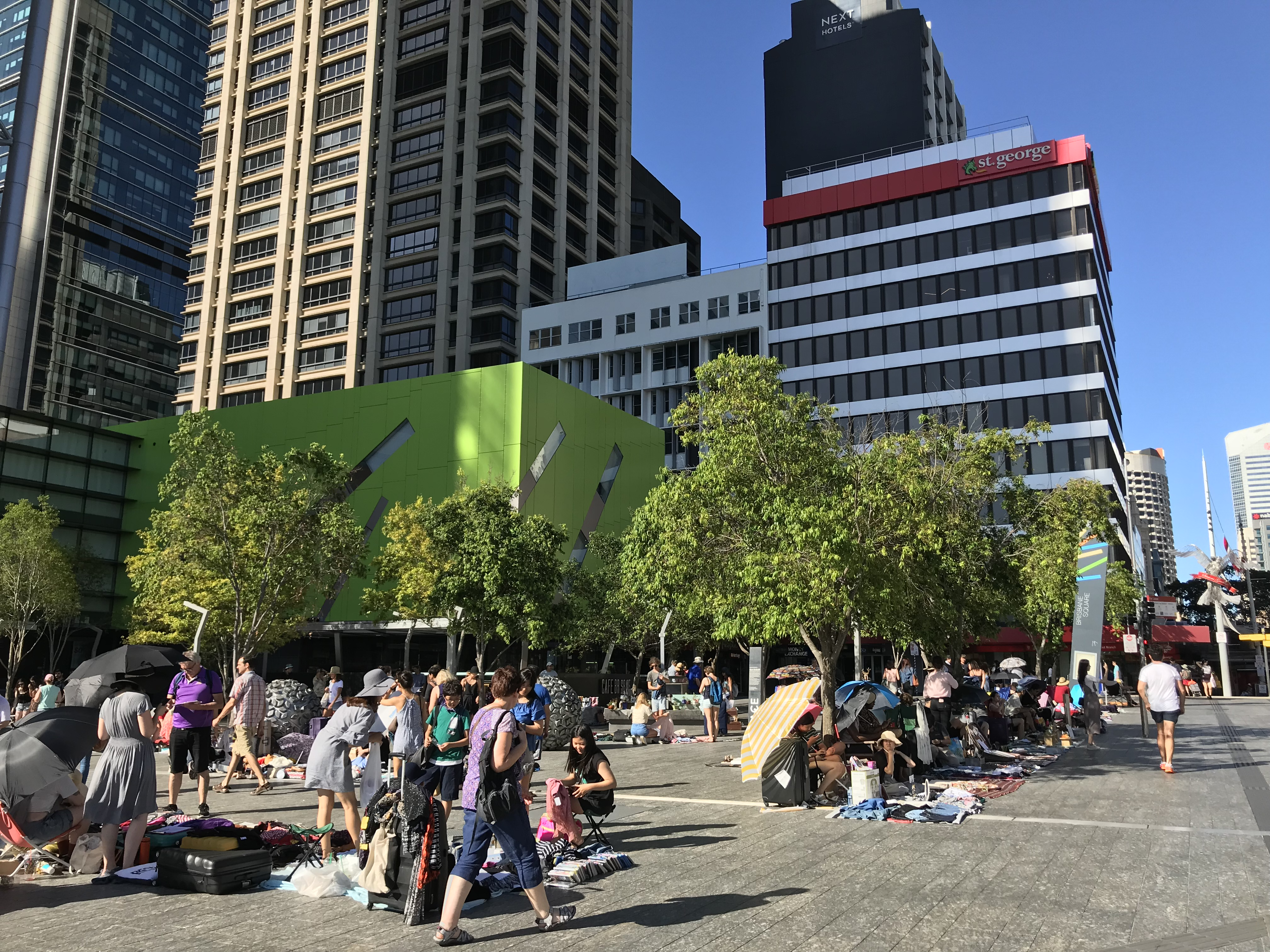
- Reddacliff Place, proposed site of the development

General information
- Status: Proposed
- Type: Office tower
- Architectural style: Modernist
- Location: 266 George Street,, Brisbane, Queensland, Australia
- Construction stopped: October 2018
- Cost: AUD$450 million

Height
- Roof: 170.7 m (560 ft)
- Top floor: 152.6 m (501 ft)

Technical details
- Floor count: 36
- Floor area: 43,824 m^{2} (471,720 sq ft)
- Lifts/elevators: 13

Design and construction
- Architects: Blight Rayner Architecture and Urbis
- Developer: Charter Hall

Brisbane Square Tower 2 is a proposed office building to be located at 266 George Street in Brisbane, Queensland, Australia.

The 36-storey, modern style, office building will be developed at the open plaza, known as Reddacliff Place, adjoining the existing Brisbane Square Tower. The site is located at the apex of the Queen Street Mall in the Brisbane CBD’s North Quarter Precinct and adjacent to the new Queens Wharf entertainment precinct. The amount of the ground floor plaza occupied by the development will be reduced as the architects have proposed a “suspended tower” with the building lobby elevated to the podium level.

The QSuper will be the anchor tenant precommitted for nearly half of the building (17,200sq m or 40%).

Development application was lodged with the Brisbane City Council in November 2017. The project was originally forecasted in late 2020, but the building was withdrawn in October 2018.

In late November, the Brisbane City Council put a protective measure on the site, as an emergency response to the development application, to prevent any future development proposals above Reddacliff Place.

== See also ==
- Brisbane Square
- List of tallest buildings in Brisbane
