= Pacific Square =

- Location: Maroubra, New South Wales, Australia
- Coordinates: 33°56′29″S 151°14′19″E
- Address: 737 Anzac Parade
- Opened: 1981; 45 years ago (original); November 2004; 22 years ago (current)
- Manager: Charter Hall
- Owner: Charter Hall
- Num. of stores: 58
- Num. of anchor tenants: 2
- Floor area: 13,778 m^{2} (148,310 sq ft)
- Floors: 2
- Parking: 620 spaces
- Website: www.pacificsquare.com.au

Pacific Square (previously known as Stockland Mall Maroubra and Stockland ShopSmart Maroubra) is an indoor/outdoor shopping centre in the suburb of Maroubra in the Eastern Suburbs of Sydney.

== History ==
The site of Pacific Square was originally the Vocalist Theatre which opened in 1939 and closed in 1961. The theatre building was used as an ice skating rink shortly after the theatre's closure.

In 1963, the Westfield Group purchased the theatre and built a Coles New World supermarket and a small shopping arcade on the site. The shopping centre was purchased in the late 1970s by Stockland who commenced construction of a new shopping centre. The construction involved the demolition of the Vocalist Theatre.

Stockland Mall Maroubra opened in 1981 and featured Grace Bros, Coles New World, Franklins and 67 stores grouped around a courtyard area. The centre was situated over two floors. The ground level contained Coles New World and access to the carpark, while Franklins was located in the upper level. Grace Bros. was located on both levels.

The opening of Westfield Eastgardens in 1987 in nearby Pagewood had been blamed for the downturn in trade in the centre.

In October 1994, Stockland Mall Maroubra was rebranded as Stockland ShopSmart Maroubra and was the first Stockland mall to convert to a factory outlet mall. Grace Bros. was converted into GoodBuy Clearance Centre which sold discounted products and clothing from Grace Bros. and Myer stores around Australia. GoodBuys Clearance Centre operated until its closure in 2002 when the centre was closed.

On the night of 23 June 1998, the courtyard area of Stockland ShopSmart Maroubra was damaged by fire that destroyed eight shops. As it was late at night, and only the Coles supermarket was open, 15 people were evacuated and there were no casualties or fatalities. Following the event, many shops in that area were closed or relocated from as little as a month up to about eleven months. The whole courtyard area was re-opened in May 1999.

In 2000, Stockland sold the centre which was subsequently known as ShopSmart Maroubra Mall. Stores inside Maroubra Mall closed in 2002 in preparation for demolition. Demolition works commenced in 2003 with the mall completely demolished to make way for a new shopping and apartment complex known as Pacific Square.

Pacific Square opened in two stages. Stage one opened in November 2004 and featured a Coles supermarket, 29 specialty shops and a town square which features an outdoor eating area surrounded by apartments and offices on the upper levels. The first stage of development costed $101 million, with stage two costing $99 million. Stage two opened in late 2007 with an Aldi supermarket and an additional 30 specialty stores. The second phase of stage two opened in November 2007, with a Fitness First on level 1. Also level 1 featured the Maroubra Medical Centre and Pacific Square Physiotherapy. The completion of this stage made Pacific Square one of Sydney's largest and most complex strata schemes.

In April 2015, Charter Hall purchased Pacific Square for $137 million.

In the early hours of 17 May 2016, around 1:53 am a pair of masked men doused petrol on a juice bar and set the store on fire. One man's leg was almost caught in the blaze. About 50 people were evacuated from the apartment complex above on Anzac Parade after the explosion ripped through the cafe and the shopfront blown into the street. When police arrived the building was well alight and it took about 30 firefighters to bring the blaze under control.

In August 2017, Pacific Square commenced $7.1 million refurbishment of the fresh food precinct. The development included a new expanded Aldi, a new relocated Liquorland to make way for the new bigger Coles. This refurbishment was completed in late 2018.

== Tenants ==
Pacific Square has 13,778 m^{2} of floor space. The major retailers include Aldi, Coles and Fitness First.
