= Bass Hill Plaza =

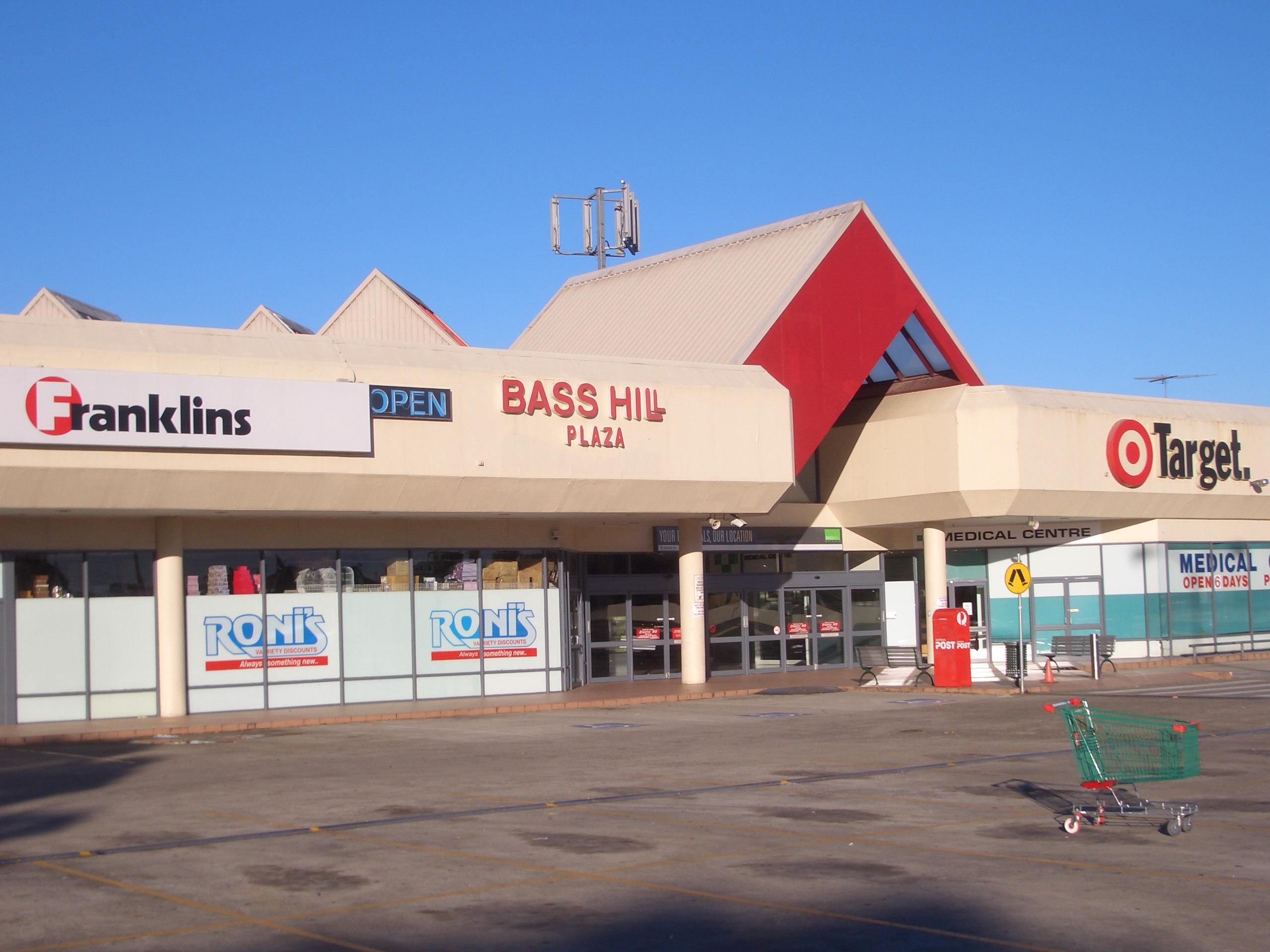
- Bass Hill Plaza in 2007 with Franklins, Target and Woolworths as main anchor tenants
- Location: Bass Hill, New South Wales, Australia
- Coordinates: 33°53′57″S 150°59′40″E
- Opened: 27 November 1984; 41 years ago
- Manager: Charter Hall (50%) JLL (50%)
- Owner: Charter Hall
- Num. of stores: 68
- Num. of anchor tenants: 3
- Floor area: 19,571 square metres (210,660 sq ft)
- Floors: 2
- Parking: 800+
- Website: basshillplaza.com.au

Bass Hill Plaza is a shopping centre in the suburb of Bass Hill in Sydney's south-west. The centre is anchored by strong performing Woolworths, Aldi, Kmart and over 50 specialty stores. Bass Hill Plaza was formerly anchored by Franklins and Target.

== History ==
Bass Hill Plaza opened on 27 November 1984 and included a Franklins Supermarket, Target and Woolworths as main anchor tenants and over 50 speciality stores. In 2013 Franklins closed its store and was replaced by Aldi which opened on 28 August 2013. Target closed its Bass Hill store on 28 June 2014 due to poor sales. On 26 November 2014, Bass Hill Plaza celebrated its 30th Birthday and the grand opening of its Kmart store that replaced the previous Target store.

Charter Hall acquired Bass Hill Plaza on 11 November 2018 for $90 million from Singapore-based Memo Corporation which also owns Strathfield Plaza.
