= Charter Hall =

Australian real estate investment management firm

Charter Hall Group
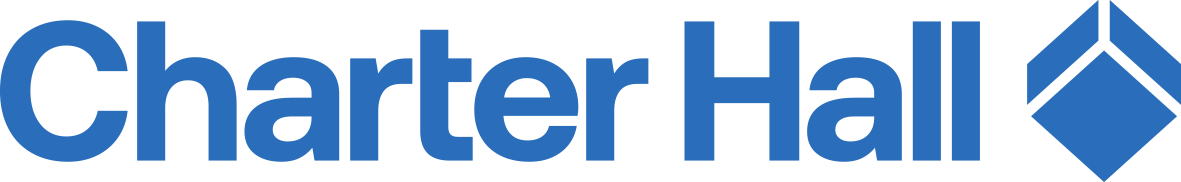

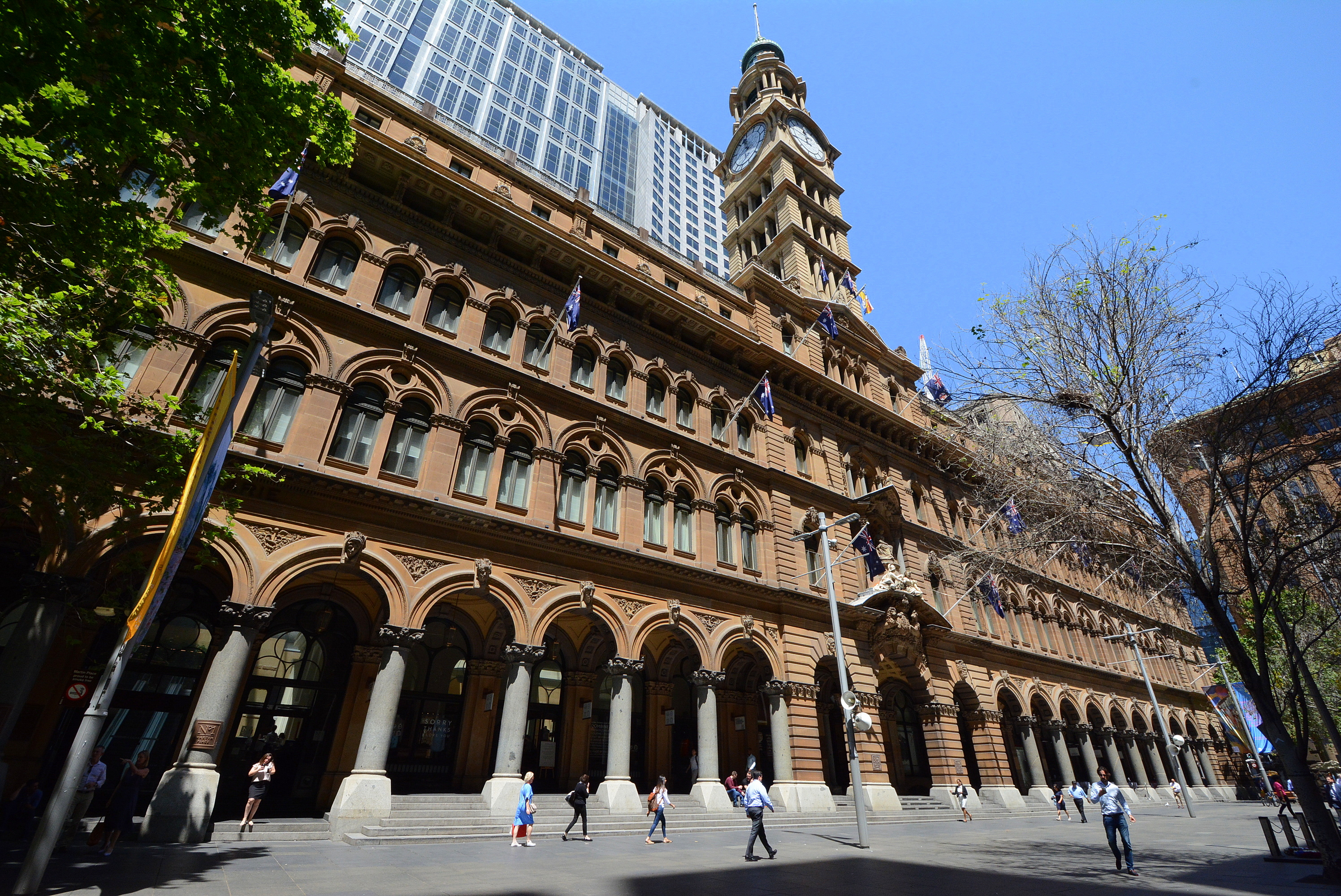
- Headquarters at No.1 Martin Place
- Company type: Public
- Traded as: ASX: CHC; S&P/ASX 200 component S&P/ASX 300 component
- Industry: Real Estate
- Founded: 1991; 34 years ago
- Founders: André Biet; David Southon; Cedric Fuchs
- Headquarters: No.1 Martin Place, Sydney, New South Wales, Australia
- Key people: David Harrison (Group CEO)
- Revenue: ▲ A$1.66 billion (FY 2022)
- Net income: ▲ A$927 million (FY 2022)
- AUM: A$83.4 billion (2022)
- Total assets: ▲ A$4.19 billion (FY 2022)
- Total equity: ▲ A$3.29 billion (FY 2022)
- Website: charterhall.com.au

Charter Hall is an Australian property development and funds management company. In 2022, IREI ranked Charter Hall as the largest real estate investment manager in Australasia based on assets under management.

== History ==
Charter Hall was founded in 1991 by André Biet, David Southon and Cedric Fuchs. Biet left in 2005 when the company listed, Southon left in 2016 and Fuch retired in 2018.

In 2004, Transfield Holdings acquired a 50% stake of Charter Hall. In the same year David Harrison joined the company and is now leading it as Group CEO.

In June 2005, the company held an initial public offering to list on the Australian Securities Exchange.

In 2010, the company acquired Macquarie Group's real estate platform.

In November 2016, Charter Hall Long WALE REIT listed on Australian Securities Exchange which at the time was the largest ever initial public offering for a diversified property trust in the Australian market.

In August 2018, Charter Hall acquired rival Folkestone in a $205 million cash deal.

In 2021, Charter Hall acquired a 50% stake in Paradice Investment Management for $207 million.

== Properties ==
Virtually all investments are based in Australasia.

- 555 Collins Street
- Bass Hill Plaza
- Brisbane Administration Centre
- Brisbane Square Tower 2
- Citigroup Centre
- Pacific Square
- Rockdale Plaza
