= Brisbane Square =

High-rise building in Brisbane, Queensland, Australia

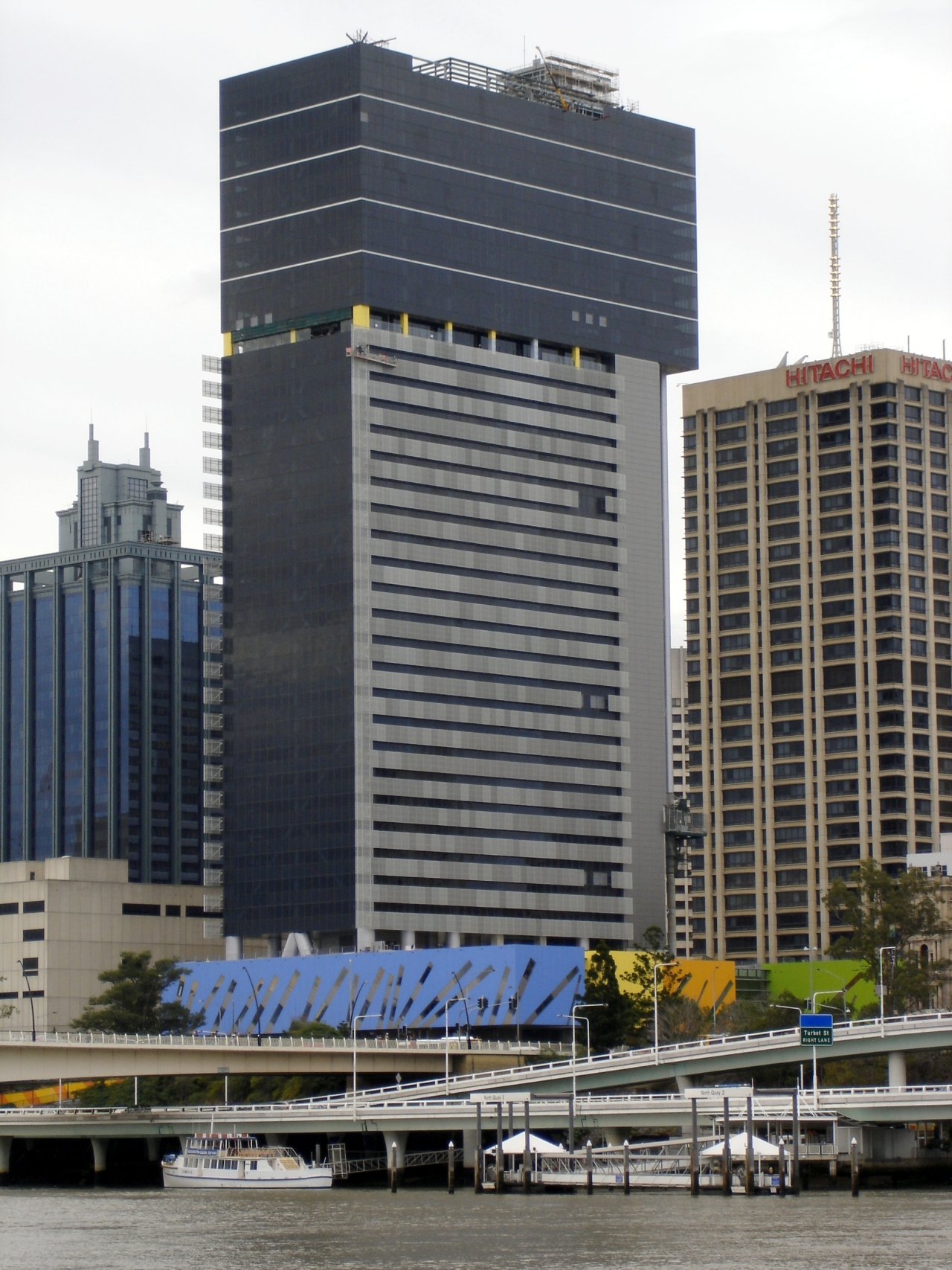
- Brisbane Square from South Bank

General information
- Status: Completed
- Location: 266 George Street, Brisbane, Queensland, Australia
- Coordinates: 27°28′14.42″S 153°1′20.98″E
- Completed: 2006
- Owner: ABN AMRO

Height
- Roof: 151 m (495 ft)

Technical details
- Floor count: 37

Design and construction
- Architecture firm: Denton Corker Marshall
- Structural engineer: Qantec McWilliams
- Main contractor: Baulderstone Hornibrook

Brisbane Square is a high-rise office tower in Brisbane City, Queensland, Australia. The building has 38 floors and rises to a height of 151 metres. The building's main use is for office space, with the lower floors leased to retailers, with a 350-space car park below the building. Significant tenants include the Brisbane City Council (floors 1-23) and the Australian Retirement Trust (floors 24–37).

Brisbane Square is situated on the block bounded by William Street, George Street, Queen Street and Adelaide Street. The office tower faces the Treasury Building on Queen Street, which formerly housed the Treasury Casino, and the former Law Courts Complex on Adelaide Street. The site is now home to the Brisbane Quarter mixed-use hotel, office and residential development.

== Design ==
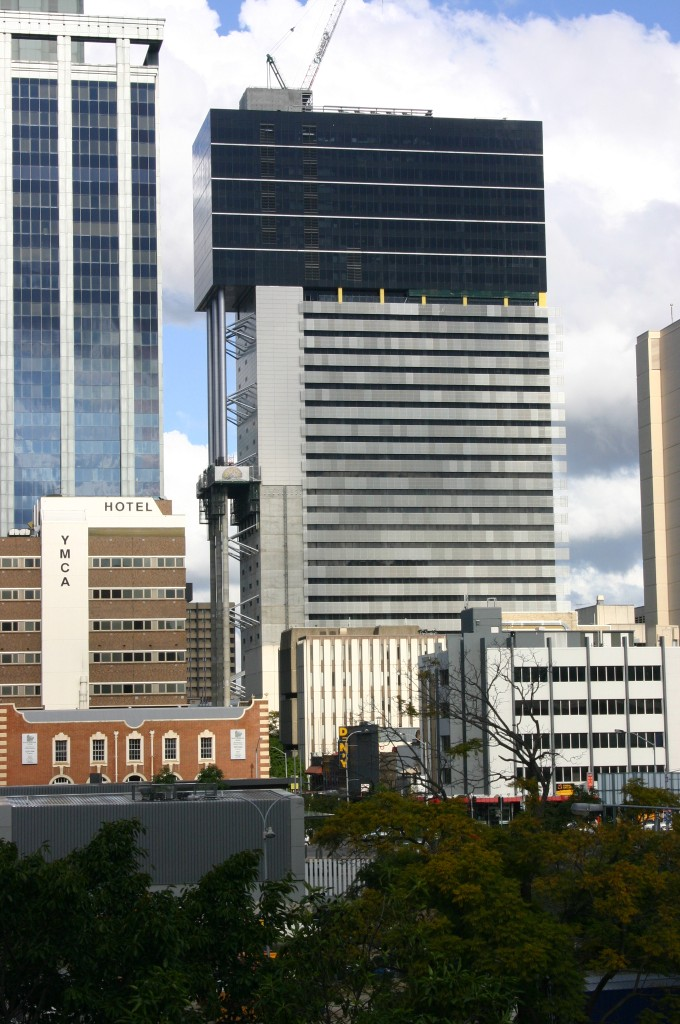
Brisbane Square under construction in 2006

Brisbane Square is owned by ABN AMRO and was designed by international architects Denton Corker Marshall. The Civil and Structural engineers for the project were Qantec McWilliam consulting engineers. Two of the four distinctive, rectangular, coloured spaces near the base of the building contain the new Brisbane City Council and Brisbane Square Library. Brisbane Square is the largest commercial office building in Australia to have been awarded a 5 star Green Star rating. The original development application included a number of residential floors on the top of the building, however, this was rejected on the basis that noise levels would be excessive.

== Construction ==
Construction was completed in late 2006. The project was constructed by Baulderstone Hornibrook.

The site of Brisbane Square was previously occupied by the now-demolished Prudential Building, state headquarters of the British insurance company Prudential Assurance Co. The 6-story art deco styled Prudential Building was completed in 1958.

== Tenants ==
The Brisbane City Council operates a public library in Brisbane Square.

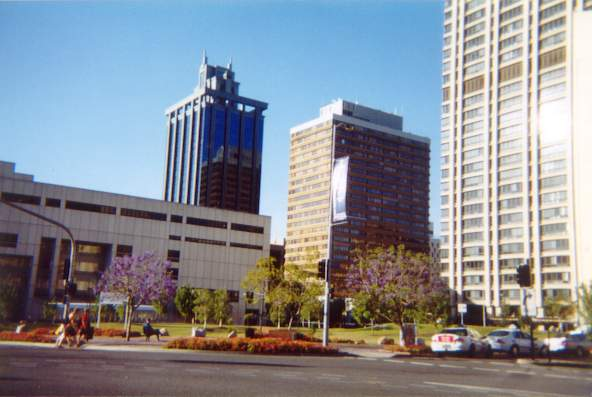
The garden park area, in front of the Law Courts Complex (and the State Law Building), is the block of land on which Brisbane Square now stands

== See also ==
- List of tallest buildings in Brisbane
- Brisbane Square Tower 2
