= QSuper =

Australian superannuation fund

- Type: Nonprofit mutual fund
- Industry: Superannuation
- Founded: 1912
- Defunct: 28 February 2022
- Fate: Merged with Sunsuper to form Australian Retirement Trust
- Headquarters: Brisbane, Queensland, Australia
- Key people: Michael Pennisi (chief executive officer)
- Website: qsuper.qld.gov.au

QSuper was an Australian superannuation fund based in Brisbane, Queensland. The fund was established by the Public Service Superannuation Act 1912 (3 Geo V. No 28). The State Public Sector Superannuation Scheme was also known as the QSuper Fund. The board of trustees of the State Public Sector Superannuation Scheme (QSuper Board) was responsible for the management of the QSuper Fund. On 26 Oct 2015 Michael Pennisi, the chief strategy officer replaced Rosemary Vilgan as CEO, who had served in that position for 18 years.

QSuper was a not-for-profit fund and had a MySuper authority, with around 585,000 members and $113 billion funds under management. On 1 December 2016, the Queensland Government passed legislation lifting application restrictions from just government employees and their spouses, which took effect on 30 June 2017.

On 28 February 2022, QSuper merged with Sunsuper to become part of the Australian Retirement Trust.

== Awards ==
- SuperRatings fund of the year for the 2014/15 and 2015/16 financial years
- Chant West Best Fund for Member Services 2016
- Chant West Best Fund Innovation Award 2016
- Awarded Pension Fund and Large Fund of the Year at the Conexus Financial Awards 2016
- Best Fund: Investments, Chant West 2017
- Pension Fund of the Year, 2018, Conexus
- Pension of the Year 2019, SuperRatings
- Best Pension Fund Manager, 2019, Money Magazine

== Services ==
- Superannuation
- Insurance
- Financial advice
