= Australian Retirement Trust =

Australian superannuation fund headquartered in Brisbane, Queensland

- Industry: Superannuation
- Predecessors: QSuper; Sunsuper
- Founded: 28 February 2022; 4 years ago
- Headquarters: Brisbane, Queensland, Australia
- Area served: Australia
- Key people: Helen Rowell (Chair); Kathy Vincent (CEO)
- Divisions: QSuper
- Website: australianretirementtrust.com.au

The Australian Retirement Trust (ART) is an Australian superannuation fund headquartered in Brisbane, Queensland. It has approximately A$375 billion in retirement savings and over 2.4 million members, making it Australia's second-largest superannuation fund and the nineteenth-largest pension fund in the world.

== History ==
The Australian Retirement Trust was founded on 28 February 2022 following the merger between Sunsuper and QSuper. It was the largest superannuation fund merger in Australian history.

Australian Retirement Trust has continued to grow through mergers. On 30 April 2022, the Australia Post Superannuation Scheme (APSS) was merged into the Australian Retirement Trust. In May 2022, Woolworths appointed the Australian Retirement Trust to manage its corporate superannuation services.

On 21 February 2023, the Commonwealth Bank Group Super announced it had entered into a memorandum of understanding to pursue a merger with the Australian Retirement Trust. In March 2023, Australian Retirement Trust and Alcoa Super announced they had entered into a memorandum of understanding to merge. In July 2024, Qantas announced it would merge its superannuation fund with Australian Retirement Trust. The merger took place on 29 March 2025.

== See also ==
- Superannuation in Australia
