= MySuper =

Retirement fund system in Australia

MySuper is part of the Stronger Super reforms announced in September 2011 by the Gillard Labor government for the Australian superannuation industry to replace the previous default funds system with a new default system using low cost and simple superannuation products. MySuper compliant products may be provided by industry superannuation fund, as well as retail superannuation funds. Funds that do not operate as default funds, such as self managed superannuation funds or choice products, are not subject to MySuper standards.

Since 1 January 2014, unless an employee has chosen another investment option, employers must pay all compulsory Superannuation Guarantee contributions into approved MySuper accounts, i.e., into superannuation products that have received a MySuper authority. From that date, superannuation funds must also credit employer contributions to a MySuper account, unless if the member has directed the trustee to do otherwise. Given that over 75% of employees stay with their employers' default fund, it was expected that the majority of employees would be in a MySuper product from that date. Superannuation funds had until 1 July 2017 to move existing default members into a complying MySuper product. For convenience, many funds simply converted an existing default option to a MySuper account, so that members would be automatically included in a MySuper product.

Members can opt out of the MySuper option at any time, or may choose a particular MySuper product. They must be given a minimum of 90 days' notice before a default transfer to a MySuper account is made.

The intention of the MySuper system is for market participants to create a range of easily comparable, relatively simple products, which in turn will focus competition on net costs and returns. The Australian Prudential Regulation Authority fosters competition by publishing fee tables and other statistics.

== Features of a MySuper account ==
The features of a MySuper product include:

- a single investment option
- a minimum level of insurance cover
- an easily comparable fee structure, with a short prescribed list of allowable fee types
- restrictions on how advice is provided and paid for, and
- rules governing fund governance and transparency.

=== MySuper investments ===
MySuper products are required to have a single investment option. Many funds, such as HESTA and Cbus, have announced that they will simply use their existing default investment option as their MySuper offering – typically Balanced or Growth. An estimated 80% of not-for-profit funds will reportedly retain their existing products for MySuper. This enables a simple transition to the MySuper regime. However, critics of this approach argue that offering a single investment option that doesn't change over an entire working life and into retirement does not reflect customers' changing attitudes to risk as they age nor as their retirement prospects change.

==== Lifecycle investment strategies ====
For these reasons, the government has allowed lifecycle investment options to be the default choice for a MySuper product. Lifecycle investment options enable trustees to automatically move members into a different investment mix based on their age and other permitted factors including balance, gender, time to retirement (or combination thereof), and can be particularly relevant as part of a transition to retirement. Sunsuper was the first fund to receive approval for their lifecycle strategy. However, a number of lifecycle strategies have since been released from companies including Aon, Suncorp, BT and First State.

=== MySuper fees ===
Fees a member can be charged in MySuper products are limited to:

- administration fee
- investment fee (including a performance-based fee)
- buy and sell spreads (limited to cost recovery)
- exit fee (limited to cost recovery), and
- switching fee (limited to cost recovery).

In addition, trustees may charge fees for certain member‑specific costs initiated by the member or a court; for example, account splitting following a family law decision.

All fees charged for MySuper products must be able to be included under these standard descriptions. This will make it simpler for members to understand what they pay and to compare fees against other MySuper products.

=== MySuper insurance ===
MySuper products are required to offer a standard, default level of life and total and permanent disability insurance. Members of MySuper products are able to opt-out of the insurance, or increase or decrease their insurance cover (if offered by the trustee) without having to leave the MySuper product.

There may be particular factors at a workplace level that influence the appropriate level and structure of insurance for employees at that workplace. Therefore, within a MySuper product, it is possible for the standard insurance cover to be replaced by a default insurance strategy tailored to meet the specific requirements of the employees of a particular employer.

== MySuper timeline ==
21 September 2011	The Government announces its decisions on key design aspects of the Stronger Super reforms.
3 November 2011	1st tranche of MySuper legislation tabled in Parliament
16 February 2012	2nd tranche of MySuper legislation tabled in Parliament
19 September 2012	3rd tranche of MySuper legislation tabled in Parliament
29 November 2012	4th tranche of MySuper legislation tabled in Parliament
1 January 2013	First date for lodgements of MySuper applications
14 February 2013	Sunsuper is the first superannuation fund awarded a MySuper authority
28 June 2013	Final regulations released
1 July 2013	MySuper products can be launched
1 January 2014	Only authorised MySuper products can receive default super contributions from an employer
1 July 2017	Last date for superannuation funds to transfer existing balances of default members to a MySuper product

After 1 January 2014, members who do not make an investment choice, or who actively choose a fund's default option, must be invested in a compliant MySuper product.

== Criticism of MySuper products ==
In 2019, Russell Mason of Deloitte argued that the introduction of MySuper products had ultimately been a waste of time, due to the fact that the majority of products were simply converted from existing fund options.
