= 555 Collins Street =

Building in Melbourne, Australia

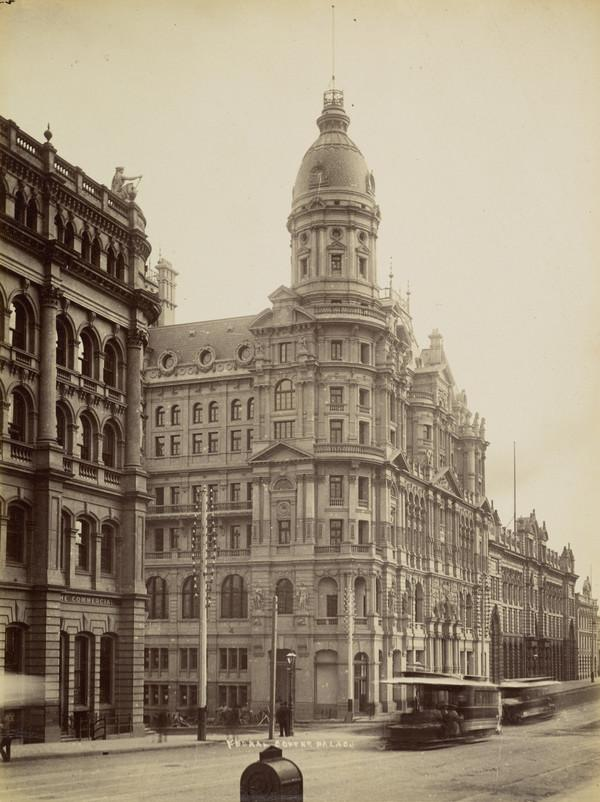
- The Federal Coffee Palace originally stood on the site, but was controversially demolished in the early 1970s.
- Interactive map of the 555 Collins Street area

General information
- Classification: Commercial
- Location: 555 Collins Street, Melbourne, Victoria, Australia
- Coordinates: 37°49′7.612″S 144°57′22.931″E
- Owner: Charter Hall

Design and construction
- Developer: Charter Hall

Website
- https://www.555collins.com.au/

555 Collins Street is a site on the corner of Collins and King Streets in the Melbourne CBD, which has been the location of three buildings in its history. Its first building was the Second Empire style Federal Coffee Palace, a 650-room hotel built in the 19th Century. The hotel was eventually replaced by Enterprise House, an office building which, after falling into disrepair, was demolished by owners Charter Hall to make way for an 85,000 m^{2} (915,000 sq ft) two stage office development. It currently is the address of a modern office building.

== History ==
=== 1970s–2019: Enterprise House ===
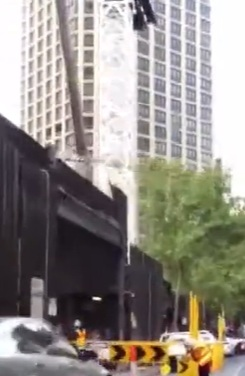
Enterprise House in 2016

Enterprise House, a 92 m (300 ft), 25-storey modernist steel office building, replaced the Federal Coffee Palace. It was completed in 1976. By the second decade of the 21st century, Enterprise House was one of many in the Melbourne CBD that had become dilapidated and vacated. Harry Stamoulis, a Melbourne developer, gained special planning permission from Victorian Planning Minister Matthew Guy for a replacement building. In 2013, he proposed an office tower 82 storeys and 404 m (1,330 ft) tall, which would have become the tallest building in Australia but was not well-received by city planners. In 2014, Stamoulis sold the building to Singaporean property developer Fragrance Group for A$78 million.

Fragrance Group proposed a 302 m (990 ft), 82-floor mixed-use building containing apartments, offices, and a hotel, which was rejected by the new Planning Minister, Richard Wynne. After unsuccessfully offering the property for sale, Fragrance Group gained planning permission in 2016 for a 160 m (520 ft) apartment tower sheathed in glass, designed by Bates Smart.

=== 2019–present: Charter Hall redevelopment ===
In October 2018, Charter Hall, an Australian property investment group, bought the site with plans to build two office buildings in conjunction with the adjoining 55 King Street property which they already owned. Demolition of Enterprise House began in May 2019, and permission to build the two towers, the first to have 34 levels, was granted in April 2020.

In December 2020, Charter Hall announced that it had secured Amazon as a major pre-commitment tenant and commenced construction of the new office tower. The new office tower was officially opened in April 2024. Other tenants include Bendigo Bank and Adelaide Bank. A restaurant, Harriot, opened in the building in June 2025.

== See also ==
- Architecture of Melbourne
