= Sunsuper =

Company

- Company type: Industry superannuation fund
- Industry: Superannuation
- Founded: 1987
- Defunct: 28 February 2022
- Fate: Merged with QSuper to form the Australian Retirement Trust
- Headquarters: Brisbane, Australia
- Area served: Australia
- Key people: Andrew Fraser, Chairman of the Board; Bernard Reilly, Chief Executive Officer; Brian Parker, Chief Economist; Ian Patrick, Chief Investment Officer

Sunsuper Superannuation Fund (Sunsuper) was an Australian public offer industry superannuation fund based in Brisbane, Queensland, Australia. It was established in 1987 as a multi-industry superannuation fund open to all workers and is profit-for-members. Sunsuper was the largest superannuation fund by membership in Queensland, with 1.3 million members and over 100,000 default employers. As at December 2020, it had more than A$79 billion in funds under management.

On 28 February 2022, Sunsuper and QSuper merged to become the Australian Retirement Trust.

== History ==
Sunsuper was established in 1987. In 1997, Sunsuper reached its first A$1 billion in funds under management (FUM). By 2007, FUM had grown to A$13 billion.

In February 2013, Sunsuper was awarded a MySuper authority.

In November 2015, Sunsuper appointed new CIO - Ian Patrick.

In April 2017, Sunsuper and Kinetic Super announced a merger.

In March 2018, Sunsuper signed up for the Insurance in Superannuation Voluntary Code of Practice - to be compliant from 1 July 2018.

In March 2019, Sunsuper and AustSafe Super merged.

In April 2019, Sunsuper merged with CBH Super.

In May 2019, long-time CEO Scott Hartley stepped down after 5 years at the helm.

In October 2019, Bernard Reilly was appointed as the new CEO of Sunsuper.

In November 2020, the IAG & NRMA Superannuation Plan merged with Sunsuper.

In March 2021, Sunsuper and QSuper announced a merger. Sunsuper and the Australia Post Superannuation Scheme (APSS) announced they will explore a merger.

On 28 February 2022, the merger of QSuper and Sunsuper to become Australian Retirement Trust was finalised.

== Governance ==
Sunsuper is run by a Trustee company called Sunsuper Pty Ltd. The Board of the trustee has equal representation of independent directors, member representatives and employer representatives. Three directors are appointed by the Queensland Chamber of Commerce and Industry Ltd, two directors by the Queensland Council of Unions and one director by the Australian Workers' Union of Employees, Queensland. The independent directors are appointed by the Board following nomination by either the member or employer representatives.

The Chairman of the Board is appointed for a two-year term and this position is rotated between the employer and the member representative directors. The normal term of appointment for a director is three years and may serve a maximum of four terms.

The Board is responsible for managing the fund, and ensures it operates in the best interests of all members and continues to comply with all legal requirements.

Sunsuper's shareholders and sponsors are Queensland Chamber of Commerce and Industry Ltd, the Queensland Council of Unions, and the Australian Workers' Union of Employees, Queensland.

== Administration ==
Sunsuper owns and controls its fund administration. Insurance cover for members is provided through group life policies with insurers such as AIA Australia Limited.

== Investments ==
Sunsuper manages its investments through a combination of in-house management and oversight of more than 40 external investment managers in Australia and major financial centres around the world.

In June 2008, Mercer was appointed as Sunsuper's investment consultant. The contract was renewed for another three years in 2011. Custodial services are provided by State Street Australia Limited.

== Awards ==
- 2020 Fund of the Year, Chant West
- 2020 Fund of the Year, SuperRatings
- Best Super Fund – Growth for 2019, Finder
- Best Super Fund Manager 2018 & 2019, Money magazine
- Best Featured Pension Fund 2017, 2018 & 2019, Money magazine & Pension Fund of the Year 2018, SuperRatings
- Fund of the Year 2018, Chant West, SuperRatings & Super Review
- Fund of the Year 2017, Chant West
- Best Super Fund - Growth, Finder
- Best Fund: Advice Services & Corporate Solutions Fund of the Year 2018, Chant West

== Annual sponsorships ==
- Dreams for a Better World $150,000 community grant program for Australian-based community groups and not-for-profit organisations.
- Sunsuper Riverfire Brisbane based public fireworks event.

== See also ==
- Superannuation in Australia
