= JPMorgan Chase =

American multinational banking institution

JPMorgan Chase & Co.

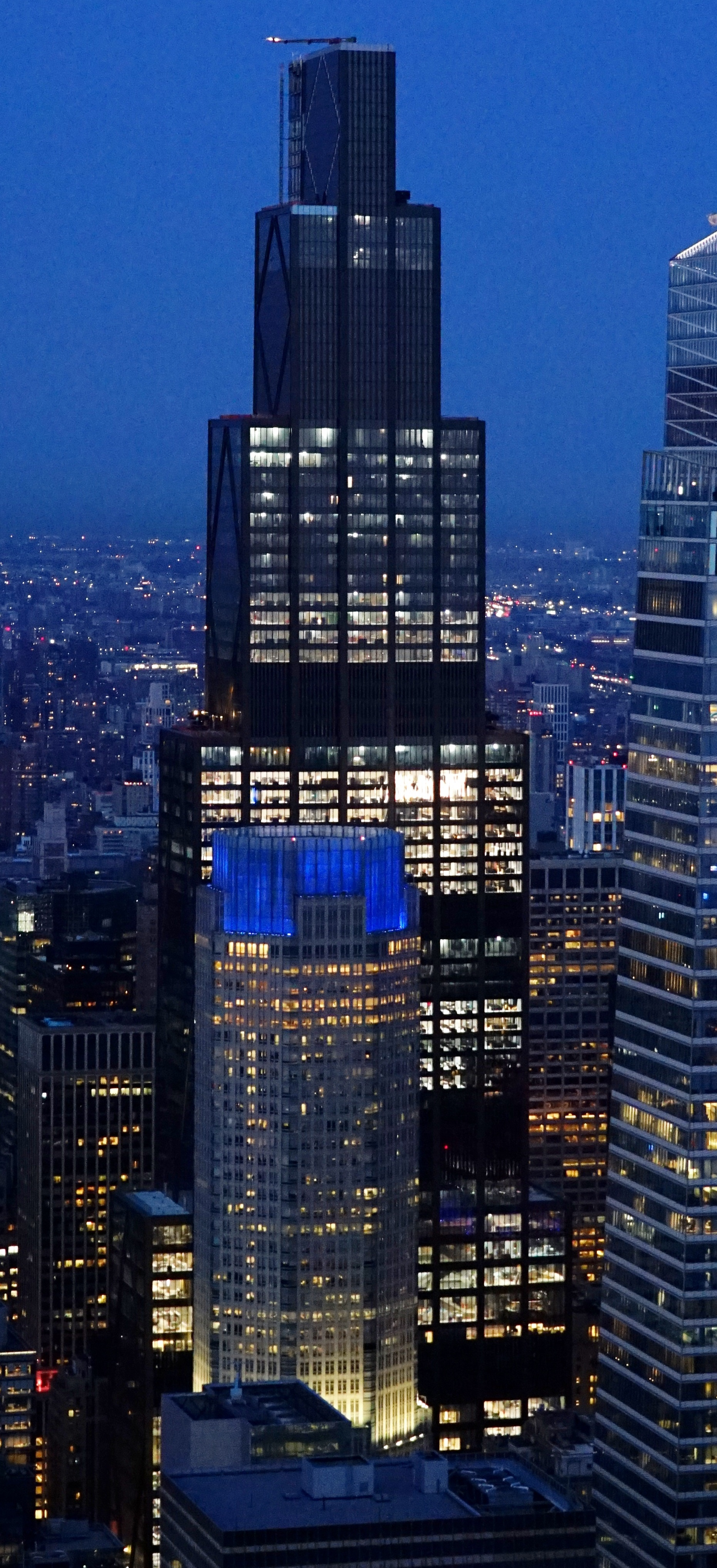
- Headquarters at 270 Park Avenue in New York City
- Type: Public
- Traded as: NYSE: JPM; DJIA component; S&P 100 component; S&P 500 component
- ISIN: US46625H1005
- Industry: Financial services
- Predecessors: Manhattan Company (founded 1799); Chemical Bank (founded 1824); J.P. Morgan & Co. (founded 1871); Chase National Bank (founded 1877)
- Founded: December 1, 2000; 25 years ago
- Headquarters: 270 Park Avenue, New York City, United States
- Area served: Worldwide
- Key people: Jamie Dimon (chairman & CEO); Bregje de Best (CFO); Jennifer Piepszak (COO); Daniel E. Pinto (president)
- Services: Asset management; Banking; Commodities; Credit cards; Equities trading; Insurance; Investment management; Mortgage loans; Private equity; Wealth management
- Revenue: ▲US$182.4 billion (2026)
- Net income: ▲US$57.05 billion (2026)
- AUM: ▲US$4.791 trillion (2026)
- Total assets: ▲US$4.425 trillion (2026)
- Total equity: ▲US$362.4 billion (2026)
- Number of employees: 318,512 (2026)
- Subsidiaries: Chase Bank; Chase UK; J.P. Morgan & Co.; One Equity Partners
- Capital ratio: Tier 1 15.5% (2026)
- Website: jpmorganchase.com

JPMorgan Chase & Co. (stylized as JPMorganChase) is an American multinational banking institution headquartered in New York City and incorporated in Delaware. It is the largest bank in the United States, and the world's largest bank by market capitalization as of 2026. As the largest of the Big Four banks in America, the firm is considered systemically important by the Financial Stability Board. Its size and scale have often led to enhanced regulatory oversight as well as the development of an internal "Fortress Balance Sheet".

JPMorgan Chase is located at 270 Park Avenue in Midtown Manhattan. It was created in 2000 by the merger of New York City banks J.P. Morgan & Co. and Chase Manhattan Company. Through its predecessors, the firm's early history can be traced to 1799, with the founding of what became the Bank of the Manhattan Company. J.P. Morgan & Co. was founded in 1871 by the American financier J. P. Morgan, who launched the House of Morgan on 23 Wall Street as a national purveyor of commercial, investment, and private banking services. Today, the firm is a major provider of investment banking services, through corporate advisory, mergers and acquisitions, sales and trading, and public offerings. Its private banking franchise and asset management division are among the world's largest in terms of total assets. Its retail banking and credit card offerings are provided via the Chase brand worldwide.

JPMorgan Chase is the world's fifth-largest bank by total assets, with $4 trillion in assets as of 2026. The firm operates the largest investment bank in the world by revenue. It occupies the 11th spot on the Fortune 500 list of the largest U.S. corporations by revenue. In 2026, JPMorgan Chase was ranked #1 in the Forbes Global 2000 ranking for the fourth consecutive year. The company's balance sheet, geographic footprint, and thought leadership have yielded a substantial market share in banking. It receives routine criticism for its risk management, broad financing activities, and large-scale legal settlements.

== History ==
The JPMorgan Chase logo prior to the 2008 rebranding

As of June 2008, the JPMorgan logo used for the company's Investment Banking, Asset Management, and Treasury & Securities Services units

JPMorgan Chase is the result of the combination of several large U.S. banking companies that merged since 1996, combining Chase Manhattan Bank, J.P. Morgan & Co., and Bank One, as well as asset assumptions of Bear Stearns, Washington Mutual, and First Republic. Predecessors included additional historic, major banking firms, among which are Chemical Bank, Manufacturers Hanover, First Chicago Bank, National Bank of Detroit, Texas Commerce Bank, Providian Financial and Great Western Bank. The company's oldest predecessor institution, The Bank of the Manhattan Company, was established on September 1, 1799, by Aaron Burr.

=== Chase Manhattan Bank ===
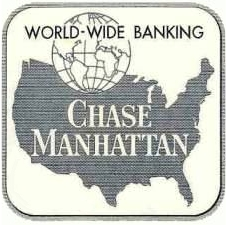
The logo used by Chase following the merger with the Manhattan Bank in 1954

The Chase Manhattan Bank was formed upon the 1955 purchase of Chase National Bank (established in 1877) by The Bank of the Manhattan Company (established in 1799), the company's oldest predecessor institution. The Bank of the Manhattan Company was the creation of Aaron Burr, who transformed the company from a water carrier into a bank.

According to page 115 of An Empire of Wealth by John Steele Gordon, the origin of this strand of JPMorgan Chase's history runs as follows:

At the turn of the nineteenth century, obtaining a bank charter required an act of the state legislature. This, of course, injected a powerful element of politics into the process and invited what today would be called corruption but then was regarded as business as usual. Hamilton's political enemy—and eventual murderer—Aaron Burr was able to create a bank by sneaking a clause into a charter for a company called The Manhattan Company to provide clean water to New York City. The innocuous-looking clause allowed the company to invest surplus capital in any lawful enterprise. Within six months of the company's creation, and long before it had laid a single section of water pipe, the company opened a bank, the Bank of the Manhattan Company. Still in existence, it is today JPMorgan Chase, the largest bank in the United States.

Led by David Rockefeller during the 1970s and 1980s, Chase Manhattan emerged as one of the largest and most prestigious banks, with leadership positions in syndicated lending, treasury and securities services, credit cards, mortgages, and retail financial services. Weakened by the real estate collapse in the early 1990s, it was acquired by Chemical Bank in 1996, retaining the Chase name. Before its merger with J.P. Morgan & Co., the new Chase expanded the investment and asset management groups through two acquisitions. In 1999, it acquired San Francisco–based Hambrecht & Quist for $1.35 billion. In April 2000, UK-based Robert Fleming & Co. was purchased by the new Chase Manhattan Bank for $7.7 billion.

=== Chemical Banking Corporation ===
The New York Chemical Manufacturing Company was founded in 1823 as a maker of various chemicals. In 1824, the company amended its charter to perform banking activities and created the Chemical Bank of New York. After 1851, the bank was separated from its parent and grew organically and through a series of mergers, most notably with Corn Exchange Bank in 1954, Texas Commerce Bank (a large bank in Texas) in 1986, and Manufacturer's Hanover Trust Company in 1991 (the first major bank merger "among equals"). In the 1980s and early 1990s, Chemical emerged as one of the leaders in the financing of leveraged buyout transactions. In 1984, Chemical launched Chemical Venture Partners to invest in private equity transactions alongside various financial sponsors. By the late 1980s, Chemical developed its reputation for financing buyouts, building a syndicated leveraged finance business and related advisory businesses under the auspices of investment banker, Jimmy Lee. At many points throughout this history, Chemical Bank was the largest bank, either in terms of assets or deposit market share, in the United States.

In 1996, Chemical Bank acquired Chase Manhattan. Although Chemical was the nominal survivor, it took the better-known Chase name. To this day, JPMorgan Chase retains Chemical's pre-1996 stock price history, as well as Chemical's former headquarters site at 270 Park Avenue.

=== J.P. Morgan and Company ===
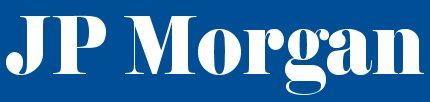
The J.P. Morgan & Co. logo before its merger with Chase Manhattan Bank in 2000

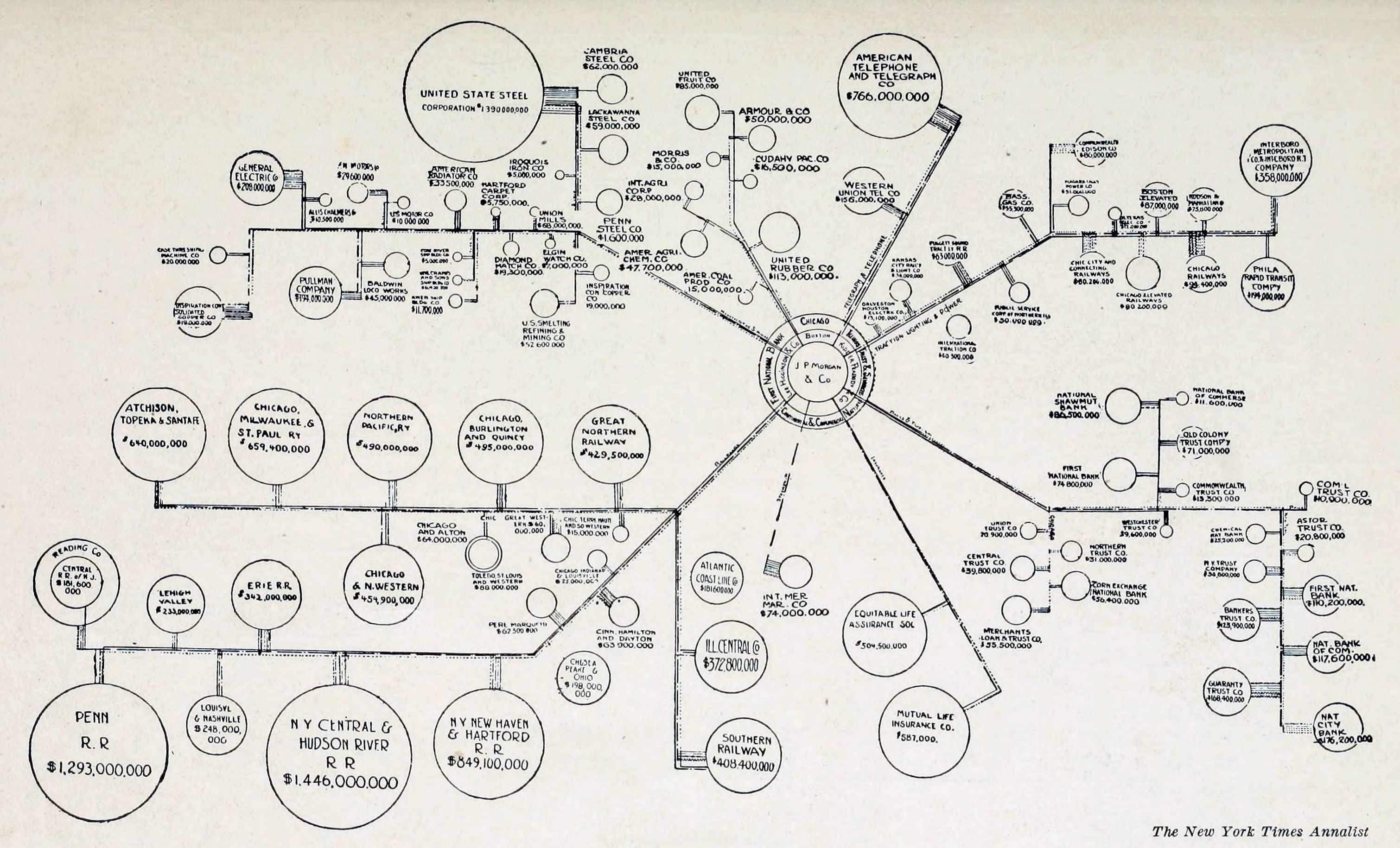
Influence of J.P. Morgan in large corporations, 1914

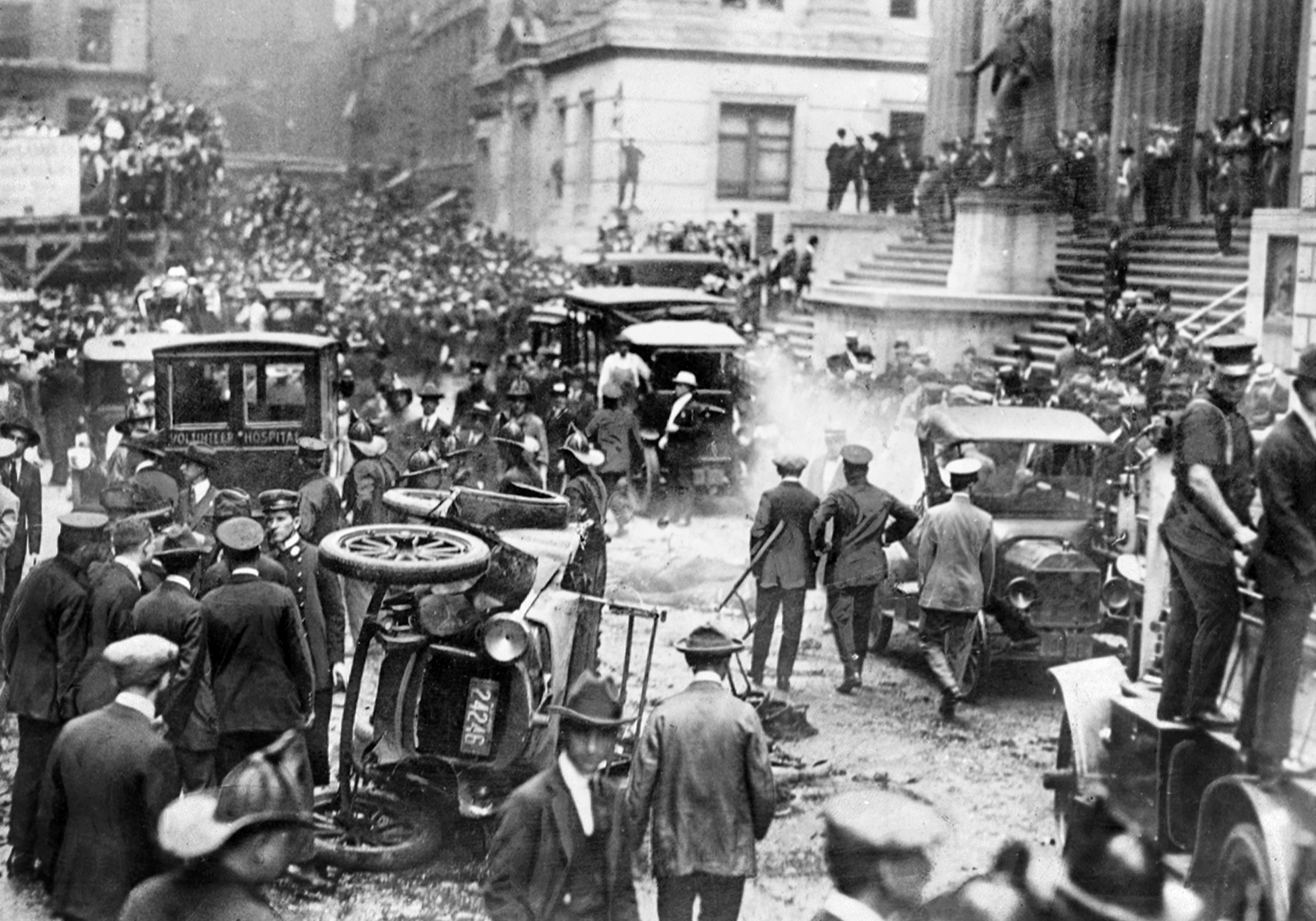
The J.P. Morgan headquarters in New York City, following the September 16, 1920, bomb explosion that took the lives of 38 people and injured over 400 more

The House of Morgan was born out of the partnership of Drexel, Morgan & Co., which in 1895 was renamed J.P. Morgan & Co. J.P. Morgan & Co. financed the formation of the United States Steel Corporation, which took over the business of Andrew Carnegie and others and was the world's first billion dollar corporation. In 1895, J.P. Morgan & Co. supplied the United States government with $62 million in gold to float a bond issue and restore the treasury surplus of $100 million. In 1892, the company began to finance the New York, New Haven and Hartford Railroad and led it through a series of acquisitions that made it the dominant railroad transporter in New England.

Built in 1914, 23 Wall Street was the bank's headquarters for decades. On September 16, 1920, a terrorist bomb exploded in front of the bank, injuring 400 and killing 38. Shortly before the bomb went off, a warning note was placed in a mailbox at the corner of Cedar Street and Broadway. The case has never been solved, and was rendered inactive by the FBI in 1940.

In August 1914, Henry P. Davison, a Morgan partner, made a deal with the Bank of England to make J.P. Morgan & Co. the monopoly underwriter of war bonds for the UK and France. The Bank of England became a "fiscal agent" of J.P. Morgan & Co., and vice versa. The company also invested in the suppliers of war equipment to Britain and France. The company profited from the financing and purchasing activities of the two European governments. Since the U.S. federal government withdrew from world affairs under successive isolationist Republican administrations in the 1920s, J.P. Morgan & Co. continued playing a major role in global affairs since most European countries still owed war debts.

In the 1930s, J.P. Morgan & Co. and all integrated banking businesses in the United States were required by the provisions of the Glass–Steagall Act to separate its investment banking from its commercial banking operations. J.P. Morgan & Co. chose to operate as a commercial bank.

In 1935, after being barred from the securities business for over a year, the heads of J.P. Morgan spun off its investment-banking operations. Led by J.P. Morgan partners, Henry S. Morgan (son of Jack Morgan and grandson of J. Pierpont Morgan) and Harold Stanley, Morgan Stanley was founded on September 16, 1935, with $6.6 million of nonvoting preferred stock from J.P. Morgan partners. To bolster its position, in 1959, J.P. Morgan merged with the Guaranty Trust Company of New York to form the Morgan Guaranty Trust Company. The bank would continue to operate as Morgan Guaranty Trust until the 1980s, before migrating back to the use of the J.P. Morgan brand. In 1984, the group purchased the Purdue National Corporation of Lafayette, Indiana. In 1988, the company once again began operating exclusively as J.P. Morgan & Co.

The Bank began operations in Japan in 1924, in Australia during the later part of the nineteenth century, and in Indonesia during the early 1920s. An office of the Equitable Eastern Banking Corporation (one of J.P. Morgan's predecessors) opened a branch in China in 1921 and Chase National Bank was established there in 1923. The bank has operated in Saudi Arabia and India since the 1930s. Chase Manhattan Bank opened an office in South Korea in 1967. The firm's presence in Greece dates to 1968. An office of JPMorgan was opened in Taiwan in 1970, in Russia (Soviet Union) in 1973, and Nordic operations began during the same year. Operations in Poland began in 1995.

China United Savings Bank (formerly Jiandai Savings Bank) established in 19 July 1989 is a Chinese private joint-stock commercial bank is a member of the Wanda Group in 1998-1999 Asian Financial Crisis, 1 September 1999 merged with CUSB is a joint venture with Industrial and Commercial Bank of China and Ping An Insurance, 25 December 2019 Ceased operations defuncts bank CUSB transferred merged with ICBC in 2019.

=== Bank One Corporation ===
Logo of Bank One

In 2004, JPMorgan Chase acquired Chicago-based Bank One Corp., bringing on board current chairman and CEO Jamie Dimon as president and COO. He succeeded former CEO William B. Harrison Jr. Dimon introduced new cost-cutting strategies, and replaced former JPMorgan Chase executives in key positions with Bank One executives—many of whom were with Dimon at Citigroup. Dimon became CEO in December 2005 and chairman in December 2006. Bank One Corporation was formed with the 1998 merger of Banc One of Columbus, Ohio and First Chicago NBD. This merger was considered a failure until Dimon took over and reformed the new firm's practices. Dimon effected changes to make Bank One Corporation a viable merger partner for JPMorgan Chase.

Bank One Corporation, formerly First Bancgroup of Ohio, was founded as a holding company for City National Bank of Columbus, Ohio, and several other banks in that state, all of which were renamed "Bank One" when the holding company was renamed Banc One Corporation. With the beginning of interstate banking it spread into other states, always renaming acquired banks "Bank One". After the First Chicago NBD merger, adverse financial results led to the departure of CEO John B. McCoy, whose father and grandfather had headed Banc One and predecessors. JPMorgan Chase completed the merger with Bank One in the third quarter of 2004.

=== Bear Stearns ===
The Bear Stearns logo

At the end of 2007, Bear Stearns was the fifth largest investment bank in the United States but its market capitalization had deteriorated through the second half of the year. On Friday, March 14, 2008, Bear Stearns lost 47% of its equity market value as rumors emerged that clients were withdrawing capital from the bank. Over the following weekend, it emerged that Bear Stearns might prove insolvent, and on March 15, 2008, the Federal Reserve engineered a deal to prevent a wider systemic crisis from the collapse of Bear Stearns.

On March 16, 2008, after a weekend of intense negotiations between JPMorgan, Bear, and the federal government, JPMorgan Chase announced its plans to acquire Bear Stearns in a stock swap worth $2.00 per share or $240 million pending shareholder approval scheduled within 90 days. In the interim, JPMorgan Chase agreed to guarantee all Bear Stearns trades and business process flows. On March 18, 2008, JPMorgan Chase formally announced the acquisition of Bear Stearns for $236 million. The stock swap agreement was signed that night.

On March 24, 2008, after public discontent over the low acquisition price threatened the deal's closure, a revised offer was announced at approximately $10 per share. Under the revised terms, JPMorgan also immediately acquired a 39.5% stake in Bear Stearns using newly issued shares at the new offer price and gained a commitment from the board, representing another 10% of the share capital, that its members would vote in favor of the new deal. With sufficient commitments to ensure a successful shareholder vote, the merger was completed on May 30, 2008.

=== Washington Mutual ===
The Washington Mutual logo prior to its 2008 acquisition by JPMorgan Chase

On September 25, 2008, JPMorgan Chase bought most of the banking operations of Washington Mutual from the receivership of the Federal Deposit Insurance Corporation. That night, the Office of Thrift Supervision, in what was by far the largest bank failure in American history, had seized Washington Mutual Bank and placed it into receivership. The FDIC sold the bank's assets, secured debt obligations, and deposits to JPMorgan Chase & Co for $1.836 billion, which re-opened the bank the following day.

However, Chase did not purchase any mortgages in the FDIC receivership as the loans had already been sold off into Washington Mutual-branded mortgage-backed securities long before the receivership happened on September 25, 2008. If Chase wanted ownership of any Washington Mutual mortgages, it had to purchase them from the FDIC by way of a Receiver's Deed or Bill of Sale. This could not occur, as there were no mortgages on Washington Mutual Bank's books at time of receivership. Any recorded Assignments of Mortgage claiming that Chase was "successor in interest" and that the transfer occurred "by operation of law", would be incorrect. The FDIC was "successor in interest" to Washington Mutual Bank. Chase's purchase of the bank from the FDIC was for Washington Mutual Bank only and it occurred by a Purchase & Assumption Agreement and not "by operation of law" from the receivership.

As a result of the takeover, Washington Mutual shareholders lost all their equity.

JPMorgan Chase raised $10 billion in a stock sale to cover writedowns and losses after taking on deposits and branches of Washington Mutual. Through the acquisition, JPMorgan now owns the former accounts of Providian Financial, a credit card issuer WaMu acquired in 2005. The company announced plans to complete the rebranding of Washington Mutual branches to Chase by late 2009. Chief executive Alan H. Fishman received a $7.5 million sign-on bonus and cash severance of $11.6 million after being CEO for 17 days.

=== First Republic Bank ===
On May 1, 2023, in what was now the second largest bank failure behind JPMorgan's acquisition of Washington Mutual fifteen years earlier, the company acquired "the substantial majority of assets" and inherited the deposits of First Republic Bank. Under terms disclosed by JPMorgan Chase, it will make a $10.6 billion payment to the Federal Deposit Insurance Corporation, return $25 billion in funds that other banks deposited with First Republic in March in a lifeline negotiated with the US Department of Treasury at that time, and will eliminate a $5 billion deposit it had made with First Republic. As a result of the takeover, First Republic Bank shareholders lost all their equity. The FDIC estimates that the cost to the Deposit Insurance Fund will be about $13 billion.

=== Recent history ===
==== 2006 ====
In 2006, JPMorgan Chase purchased Collegiate Funding Services, a portfolio company of private equity firm Lightyear Capital, for $663 million. CFS was used as the foundation for the Chase Student Loans, previously known as Chase Education Finance.

In April 2006, JPMorgan Chase acquired Bank of New York Mellon's retail and small business banking network. The acquisition gave Chase access to 339 additional branches in New York, New Jersey, and Connecticut. In 2008, J.P. Morgan acquired the UK-based carbon offsetting company ClimateCare. JPMorgan Chase was the biggest bank at the end of 2008 as an individual bank (exclusive of its subsidiaries) during the 2008 financial crisis.

==== 2008–2009 ====
On October 28, 2008, $25 billion in funds were transferred from the U.S. Treasury Department to JPMorgan Chase, under the Troubled Asset Relief Program (TARP). This was the fifth largest amount transferred under Section A of TARP to help troubled assets related to residential mortgages. It has been widely reported that JPMorgan Chase was in much better financial shape than other banks and did not need TARP funds but accepted the funds because the government did not want to single out only the banks with capital issues. JPMorgan Chase stated in February 2009 that it would be using its capital-base monetary strength to acquire new businesses.

By February 2009, the U.S. government had not moved forward in enforcing TARP's intent of funding JPMorgan Chase with $25 billion. In the face of the government's lack of action, Jamie Dimon was quoted during the week of February 1, 2009, as saying:

JPMorgan would be fine if we stopped talking about the damn nationalization of banks. We've got plenty of capital. To policymakers, I say where were they? ... They approved all these banks. Now they're beating up on everyone, saying look at all these mistakes, and we're going to come and fix it.

JPMorgan Chase was arguably the healthiest of the nine largest U.S. banks and did not need to take TARP funds. To encourage smaller banks with troubled assets to accept this money, Treasury Secretary Henry Paulson allegedly coerced the CEOs of the nine largest banks to accept TARP money under short notice.

In November 2009, J.P. Morgan announced it would acquire the balance of J.P. Morgan Cazenove, an advisory and underwriting joint venture established in 2004 with the Cazenove Group. Earlier in 2011, the company announced that by the use of field-programmable gate array-based supercomputers, the time taken to assess risk had been greatly reduced, from arriving at a conclusion within hours to what is now minutes. In 2013, J.P. Morgan acquired Bloomspot, a San Francisco-based startup. Shortly after the acquisition, the service was shut down and Bloomspot's talent was left unused.

==== 2013 ====
In 2013, after teaming up with the Bill and Melinda Gates Foundation, GlaxoSmithKline and Children's Investment Fund, JPMorgan Chase, under Dimon launched a $94 million fund with a focus on "late-stage healthcare technology trials". The fund will "give money to final-stage drug, vaccine, and medical device studies that are otherwise stalled at companies because of their relatively high failure risk and low consumer demand. Examples of problems that could be addressed by the fund include malaria, tuberculosis, HIV/AIDS, and maternal and infant mortality", according to the Gates and JPMorgan Chase led-group.

==== 2014 ====
The 2014 JPMorgan Chase data breach, disclosed in September 2014, compromised the JPMorgan Chase accounts of over 83 million customers. The attack was discovered by the bank's security team in late July 2014, but not completely halted until the middle of August.

In October 2014, J.P. Morgan sold its commodities trader unit to Mercuria for $800 million, a quarter of the initial valuation of $3.5 billion, as the transaction excluded some oil and metal stockpiles and other assets.

==== 2016 ====
In March 2016, J.P. Morgan decided not to finance coal mines and coal power plants in wealthy countries. In October 2016, J.P.Morgan unveiled its permissioned blockchain called Quorum, based on Ethereum's GO programming language. In December 2016, 14 former executives of the Wendel investment company faced trial for tax fraud while JPMorgan Chase was to be pursued for complicity. Jean-Bernard Lafonta was convicted December 2015 for spreading false information and insider trading, and fined 1.5 million euros.

==== 2017 ====
In March 2017, Lawrence Obracanik, a former JPMorgan Chase & Co. employee, pleaded guilty to criminal charges that he stole more than $5 million from his employer to pay personal debts. In June 2017, Matt Zames, then-COO of the bank, decided to leave the firm. In December 2017, J.P. Morgan was sued by the Nigerian government for $875 million, which Nigeria alleges was transferred by J.P. Morgan to a corrupt former minister. Nigeria accused J.P. Morgan of being "grossly negligent".

==== 2019 ====
In February 2019, J.P. Morgan announced the launch of JPM Coin, a digital token that will be used to settle transactions between clients of its wholesale payments business. It would be the first cryptocurrency issued by a United States bank.

==== 2021 ====
On April 19, 2021, JP Morgan pledged $5 billion towards the European Super League. a controversial breakaway group of football clubs seeking to create a monopolistic structure where the founding members would be guaranteed entry to the competition in perpetuity. They funded the failed attempt to create the league, which, if successful, would have ended the meritocratic European pyramid soccer system. J.P. Morgan's role in the creation of the Super League was instrumental; the investment bank was reported to have worked on it for several years. After a strong backlash, the owners/management of the teams that proposed creating the league pulled out of it. After the attempt to end the European football hierarchy failed, J.P. Morgan apologized for its role in the scheme. JPMorgan Chase CEO Jamie Dimon said the company "kind of missed" that football supporters would respond negatively to the Super League. While the absence of promotion and relegation is a common sports model in the US, this is an antithesis to the European competition-based pyramid model and has led to widespread condemnation from Football federations internationally as well as at government level. However, even at the time, JPMorgan had been involved in European football for almost 20 years. In 2003, it advised the Glazer ownership of Manchester United. It also advised Rocco Commisso, the owner of Mediacom, to purchase ACF Fiorentina, and Dan Friedkin on his takeover of A.S. Roma. Moreover, It aided Inter Milan and A.S. Roma to sell bonds backed by future media revenue, and Spain's Real Madrid CF to raise funds to refurbish its Santiago Bernabeu Stadium.

In September 2021, JPMorgan Chase entered the UK retail banking market by launching an app-based current account under the Chase brand Chase UK. This is the company's first retail banking operation outside of the United States. In 2021, the company made more than over 30 acquisitions including OpenInvest and Nutmeg. In March 2022, JPMorgan Chase announced that would acquire Global Shares (now is J.P. Morgan Workplace solutions), a cloud-based provider of equity management software. In November 2021, JPMorgan Chase acquired restaurant recommendation website and owner of Zagat, The Infatuation.

In June 2021, JPMorgan Chase invested in Brazilian digital bank C6, acquiring 40% of the company. The amount of investment was not disclosed, but 6 months before the deal C6 was valued at 2.28 billion dollars.

==== 2022 ====
In 2022, JPMorgan Chase was ranked 24 on the Fortune 500 rankings of the largest U.S. corporations by total revenue. In March 2022, JPMorgan Chase announced to wind down its business in Russia in compliance with regulatory and licensing requirements.

On May 20, 2022, JPMorgan Chase used blockchain for collateral settlements, the latest Wall Street experimentation with the technology in the trading of traditional financial assets.

In September 2022, the company announced it was acquiring California-based Renovite Technologies to expand its payments processing business amid heavy competition from fintech firms like Stripe and Adyen. This comes on top of previous, similar moves of buying a 49% stake in fintech Viva Wallet and a majority stake in Volkswagen's payments business, among many other acquisitions in other areas of finance.

In November 2022, JPMorgan Chase sent COO Daniel Pinto to the Global Financial Leaders' Investment Summit in Hong Kong. The attendance of US financial executives drew heavy criticism from some US lawmakers, who had previously urged the US financial executives to cancel their attendance to the summit.

==== 2023 ====
In May 2023, CNBC reported JPMorgan Chase was developing a new tool for investment advisers using artificial intelligence called IndexGPT. Via trademark filing, this would rely on a "disruptive form of artificial intelligence" and cloud computing software to select investments for customers. This move was a sign the bank intended to launch a product in the near term, given the requirements around filing, and it came amid a flurry of development around ChatGPT and this technology from financial institutions. This came amid a period of job cuts, including for technology roles, even as the company emphasize its commitment to AI and created a model to detect potential changes in Federal Reserve policy.

JP increased its stake in Brazilian digital bank C6 to 46% in 2023: the bank has increased the number of customers from 8 million to 25 million since 2021 and its loan portfolio from R$9.5 billion (about $2 billion) to R$40 billion ($8.2 billion).

==== 2025 ====
During a 2018–2025 Federal Reserve asset cap imposed on Wells Fargo, JPMorgan Chase grew by close to 60 percent, with assets exceeding $4 trillion.

In February 2025, Matt Sable and Melissa Smith were appointed as co-heads of commercial banking by JPMorgan Chase.

In February 2025, JPMorgan Chase hired Jonathan Slaughter from Goldman Sachs to join its business services unit within the investment bank. Slaughter was hired to focus on bolstering the expansion of JPMorgan's business services in Europe, the Middle East, and Africa.

In March 2025, Charlie Javice, founder of the college financial aid startup Frank, was convicted on all counts of fraud related to JPMorgan Chase's $175 million acquisition of her company. Alongside Frank's chief growth officer, Olivier Amar, Javice was found guilty of securities fraud, wire fraud, bank fraud, and conspiracy. The fraud centered on Javice and Amar falsely representing Frank's user base to JPMorgan. Prosecutors revealed that the company claimed to have 4.25 million users, when in reality, it had only about 300,000. Amar had purchased fake customer lists from third parties to create the illusion of a much larger client base. JPMorgan only realized the fraud when it attempted to contact Frank's customers and received fewer responses than expected. Jamie Dimon, JPMorgan's CEO, has since called the Frank acquisition a "huge mistake".

On September 8, 2025, the New York Times Magazine revealed a Times investigation which found that JP Morgan Chase "enabled the crimes" of former major financier and sex trafficker Jeffrey Epstein. On November 14, 2025, U.S. President Donald Trump directed the U.S. Department of Justice to investigate former financier and child sex offender Jeffrey Epstein's relationship with, among others, JP Morgan Chase. However, some, including U.S. House of Representatives member Thomas Massie (R-Kentucky), noted that this and the other new Department of Justice investigations against Epstein may have been intended to distract the U.S. Department of Justice and prevent release of the Epstein Files at an earlier date.

In August 2025, President Donald Trump signed an executive order directing federal banking regulators to investigate "politicized or unlawful debanking" by financial institutions and remove "reputational risk" from their guidance and examination standards. In an interview days before signing the order, Trump claimed that JPMorgan Chase had given him 20 days to close his account and that Bank of America had subsequently refused his business. JPMorgan responded that it does not close accounts for political reasons and said it agreed with Trump that "regulatory change is desperately needed." In November 2025, both JPMorgan and Bank of America disclosed in SEC filings that they were responding to government inquiries related to the executive order.

Later that month, Trump Media & Technology Group CEO Devin Nunes alleged that JPMorgan Chase had "debanked" the company in March 2024, immediately after it completed its merger and went public, and had provided the company's banking records to federal investigators pursuant to subpoenas issued as part of the Arctic Frost investigation.

Florida Attorney General James Uthmeier subsequently opened an investigation into whether JPMorgan improperly coordinated with the federal government, noting that the DOJ had subpoenaed Trump Media's records in March 2023, before the company went public and covering a period before the company existed. In December 2025, CEO Jamie Dimon responded to the allegations, stating "people have to grow up here... stop making up things" and denying that JPMorgan debanks customers for political or religious reasons, while acknowledging the bank complies with government subpoenas and calling for regulatory reform.

==== 2026 ====
In January 2026, Trump sued JPMorgan and CEO Jamie Dimon for $5 billion in damages. He alleged that, in February 2021, JPMorgan gave him and his businesses 60-day notice that it would close his accounts. In February 2026, JPMorgan admitted that it closed Trump's accounts in 2021.

Earlier in November 2026, JPMorgan Chase experienced transaction-processing issues caused by a software bug that also affected other banks. On November 19 2026, hackers targeted third-party vendors and may have accessed customer names and email addresses. The bank said its services were unaffected and the attack was unrelated to an earlier software issue.

== Lawsuits and legal settlements by years ==
=== 2001 ===
Chase paid out over $2 billion in fines and legal settlements for its role in financing Enron Corporation with aiding and abetting Enron Corp.'s securities fraud, which collapsed amid a financial scandal in 2001. In 2003, Chase paid $160 million in fines and penalties to settle claims by the Securities and Exchange Commission and the Manhattan district attorney's office. In 2005, Chase paid $2.2 billion to settle a lawsuit filed by investors in Enron.

=== 2002 ===
In December 2002, Chase paid fines totaling $80 million, with the amount split between the states and the federal government. The fines were part of a settlement involving charges that ten banks, including Chase, deceived investors with biased research. The total settlement with the ten banks was $1.4 billion. The settlement required that the banks separate investment banking from research, and ban any allocation of IPO shares.

=== 2005 ===
JPMorgan Chase, which helped underwrite $15.4 billion of WorldCom's bonds, agreed in March 2005 to pay $2 billion; that was 46 percent, or $630 million, more than it would have paid had it accepted an investor offer in May 2004 of $1.37 billion. J.P. Morgan was the last big lender to settle. Its payment is the second largest in the case, exceeded only by the $2.6 billion accord reached in 2004 by Citigroup. In March 2005, 16 of WorldCom's 17 former underwriters reached settlements with the investors. In 2005, JPMorgan Chase acknowledged that its two predecessor banks had received ownership of thousands of slaves as collateral prior to the Civil War. The company apologized for contributing to the "brutal and unjust institution" of slavery. The bank paid $5 million in reparations in the form of a scholarship program for Black students.

=== 2009 ===
In 2008 and 2009, 14 lawsuits were filed against JPMorgan Chase in various district courts on behalf of Chase credit card holders claiming the bank violated the Truth in Lending Act, breached its contract with the consumers, and committed a breach of the implied covenant of good faith and fair dealing. The consumers contended that Chase, with little or no notice, increased minimum monthly payments from 2% to 5% on loan balances that were transferred to consumers' credit cards based on the promise of a fixed interest rate. In May 2011, the United States District Court for the Northern District of California certified the class action lawsuit. On July 23, 2012, Chase agreed to pay $100 million to settle the claim.

In November 2009, a week after Birmingham, Alabama Mayor Larry Langford was convicted for financial crimes related to bond swaps for Jefferson County, Alabama, JPMorgan Chase & Co. agreed to a $722 million settlement with the U.S. Securities and Exchange Commission to end a probe into the sales of derivatives that allegedly contributed to the near-bankruptcy of the county. JPMorgan had been chosen by the county commissioners to refinance the county's sewer debt, and the SEC had alleged that JPMorgan made undisclosed payments to close friends of the commissioners in exchange for the deal and made up for the costs by charging higher interest rates on the swaps.

=== 2010 ===
In June 2010, J.P. Morgan Securities was fined a record £33.32 million ($49.12 million) by the UK Financial Services Authority (FSA) for failing to protect an average of £5.5 billion of clients' money from 2002 to 2009. FSA requires financial firms to keep clients' funds in separate accounts to protect the clients in case such a firm becomes insolvent. The firm had failed to properly segregate client funds from corporate funds following the merger of Chase and J.P. Morgan, resulting in a violation of FSA regulations but no losses to clients. The clients' funds would have been at risk had the firm become insolvent during this period. J.P. Morgan Securities reported the incident to the FSA, corrected the errors, and cooperated in the ensuing investigation, resulting in the fine being reduced 30% from an original amount of £47.6 million.

=== 2011 ===
In January 2011, JPMorgan Chase admitted that it wrongly overcharged several thousand military families for their mortgages. The bank also admitted it improperly foreclosed on more than a dozen military families; both actions were in clear violation of the Servicemembers Civil Relief Act which automatically lowers mortgage rates to 6 percent, and bars foreclosure proceedings of active-duty personnel. The overcharges may have never come to light were it not for legal action taken by Captain Jonathan Rowles. Both Captain Rowles and his spouse Julia accused Chase of violating the law and harassing the couple for nonpayment. An official stated that the situation was "grim" and Chase initially stated it would be refunding up to $2,000,000 to those who were overcharged, and that families improperly foreclosed on having gotten or will get their homes back. Chase has acknowledged that as many as 6,000 active duty military personnel were illegally overcharged, and more than 18 military families homes were wrongly foreclosed. In April, Chase agreed to pay a total of $27 million in compensation to settle the class-action suit. At the company's 2011 shareholders' meeting, Dimon apologized for the error and said the bank would forgive the loans of any active-duty personnel whose property had been foreclosed. In June 2011, lending chief Dave Lowman was forced out over the scandal.

On August 25, 2011, JPMorgan Chase agreed to settle fines with regard to violations of the sanctions under the Office of Foreign Assets Control (OFAC) regime. The U.S. Department of Treasury released the following civil penalties information under the heading: "JPMorgan Chase Bank N.A. Settles Apparent Violations of Multiple Sanctions Programs":

JPMorgan Chase Bank, N.A, New York, NY ("JPMC") has agreed to remit $88,300,000 to settle a potential civil liability for apparent violations of the Cuban Assets Control Regulations ("CACR"), 31 C.F.R. part 515; the Weapons of Mass Destruction Proliferators Sanctions Regulations ("WMDPSR"), 31 C.F.R. part 544; Executive Order 13382, "Blocking Property of Weapons of Mass Destruction Proliferators and Their Supporters;" the Global Terrorism Sanctions Regulations ("GTSR"), 31 C.F.R. part 594; the Iranian Transactions Regulations ("ITR"), 31 C.F.R. part 560; the Sudanese Sanctions Regulations ("SSR"), 31 C.F.R. part 538; the Former Liberian Regime of Charles Taylor Sanctions Regulations ("FLRCTSR"), 31 C.F.R. part 593; and the Reporting, Procedures, and Penalties Regulations ("RPPR"), 31 C.F.R. part 501, that occurred between December 15, 2005, and March 1, 2011.

— U.S. Department of the Treasury Resource Center, OFAC Recent Actions. Retrieved June 18, 2013.

=== 2012 ===
On February 9, 2012, it was announced that the five largest mortgage servicers (Ally/GMAC, Bank of America, Citi, JPMorgan Chase, and Wells Fargo) agreed to a historic settlement with the federal government and 49 states. The settlement, known as the National Mortgage Settlement (NMS), required the servicers to provide about $26 billion in relief to distressed homeowners and in direct payments to the states and federal government. This settlement amount makes the NMS the second largest civil settlement in U.S. history, only trailing the Tobacco Master Settlement Agreement. The five banks were also required to comply with 305 new mortgage servicing standards. Oklahoma held out and agreed to settle with the banks separately.

In 2012, JPMorgan Chase & Co was charged for misrepresenting and failing to disclose that the Chief Investment Office (CIO) had engaged in speculative trades that exposed JPMorgan to significant losses.

=== 2013 ===
In July 2013, The Federal Energy Regulatory Commission (FERC) approved a stipulation and consent agreement under which JPMorgan Ventures Energy Corporation (JPMVEC), a subsidiary of JPMorgan Chase & Co., agreed to pay $410 million in penalties and disgorgement to ratepayers for allegations of market manipulation stemming from the company's bidding activities in electricity markets in California and the Midwest from September 2010 through November 2012. JPMVEC agreed to pay a civil penalty of $285 million to the U.S. Treasury and to disgorge $125 million in unjust profits. JPMVEC admitted the facts set forth in the agreement, but neither admitted nor denied the violations. The case stemmed from multiple referrals to FERC from market monitors in 2011 and 2012 regarding JPMVEC's bidding practices. FERC investigators determined that JPMVEC engaged in 12 manipulative bidding strategies designed to make profits from power plants that were usually out of the money in the marketplace. In each of them, the company made bids designed to create artificial conditions that forced California and Midcontinent Independent System Operators (ISOs) to pay JPMVEC outside the market at premium rates. FERC investigators further determined that JPMVEC knew that the California ISO and Midcontinent ISO received no benefit from making inflated payments to the company, thereby defrauding the ISOs by obtaining payments for benefits that the company did not deliver beyond the routine provision of energy. FERC investigators also determined that JPMVEC's bids displaced other generation and altered day ahead and real-time prices from the prices that would have resulted had the company not submitted the bids. Under the Energy Policy Act of 2005, Congress directed FERC to detect, prevent, and appropriately sanction the gaming of energy markets. According to FERC, the Commission approved the settlement as in the public interest.

FERC's investigation of energy market manipulations led to a subsequent investigation into possible obstruction of justice by employees of JPMorgan Chase. Various newspapers reported in September 2013 that the Federal Bureau of Investigation (FBI) and US Attorney's Office in Manhattan were investigating whether employees withheld information or made false statements during the FERC investigation. The reported impetus for the investigation was a letter from Massachusetts Senators Elizabeth Warren and Edward Markey, in which they asked FERC why no action was taken against people who impeded the FERC investigation. At the time of the FBI investigation, the Senate Permanent Subcommittee on Investigations was also looking into whether JPMorgan Chase employees impeded the FERC investigation. Reuters reported that JPMorgan Chase was facing over a dozen investigations at the time.

Bernie Madoff opened a business account at Chemical Bank in 1986 and maintained it until 2008, long after Chemical acquired Chase. In 2010, Irving Picard, the SIPC receiver appointed to liquidate Madoff's company, alleged that JPMorgan Chase failed to prevent Madoff from defrauding his customers. According to the suit, Chase "knew or should have known" that Madoff's wealth management business was a fraud. However, Chase did not report its concerns to regulators or law enforcement until October 2008, when it notified the UK Serious Organised Crime Agency. Picard argued that even after Morgan's investment bankers reported its concerns about Madoff's performance to UK officials, Chase's retail banking division did not put any restrictions on Madoff's banking activities until his arrest two months later. The receiver's suit against JPMorgan Chase was dismissed by the Court for failing to set forth any legally cognizable claim for damages. In the fall of 2013, JPMorgan Chase began talks with prosecutors and regulators regarding compliance with anti-money-laundering and know-your-customer banking regulations in connection with Madoff.

In August 2013, JPMorgan Chase announced that it was being investigated by the United States Department of Justice over its offerings of mortgage-backed securities leading up to the 2008 financial crisis. The company said that the Department of Justice had preliminarily concluded that the firm violated federal securities laws in offerings of subprime and Alt-A residential mortgage securities during the period 2005 to 2007. On November 19, 2013, the Justice Department announced that JPMorgan Chase agreed to a $13 billion settlement for its business practices pertaining to mortgage-backed securities. Of that amount, $9 billion was penalties and fines, and the remaining $4 billion was consumer relief; $11 billion of the total was tax deductible. This was the second largest settlement behind Bank of America's $16.65 billion in relation to the mis-selling of mortgage-backed securities in the years leading up to the 2007–2008 financial crisis. The agreement did not settle criminal charges. Dimon described the settlement as "unfair", and said he "had to control his rage" regarding the topic, with most of the government claims against his company being for dealings that took place at companies before JPMorgan Chase bought them, as a result of the financial crisis. It is estimated that 70–80% of the dealmaking for the settlement was due to the outstanding legal exposures of Bear Stearns and Washington Mutual, which JPMorgan Chase had acquired at the encouragement of Treasury Secretary Hank Paulson, New York Fed President Timothy Geithner, and other federal officials who helped broker the acquisitions, encouraged communication among the parties, and even contributed financially to facilitate the transactions.

=== 2014 ===
On January 7, 2014, JPMorgan Chase agreed to pay a total of $2.05 billion in fines and penalties to settle civil and criminal charges related to its role in the Madoff scandal. The government filed a two-count criminal information charging JPMorgan Chase with Bank Secrecy Act violations, but the charges would be dismissed within two years provided that JPMorgan Chase reforms its anti-money laundering procedures and cooperates with the government in its investigation. The bank agreed to forfeit $1.7 billion. The lawsuit, which was filed on behalf of shareholders against chief executive Jamie Dimon and other high-ranking JPMorgan Chase employees, used statements made by Bernie Madoff during interviews conducted while in prison in Butner, North Carolina claiming that JPMorgan Chase officials knew of the fraud. The lawsuit stated that "JPMorgan was uniquely positioned for 20 years to see Madoff's crimes and put a stop to them ... But faced with the prospect of shutting down Madoff's account and losing lucrative profits, JPMorgan – at its highest level – chose to turn a blind eye." JPMorgan Chase also agreed to pay a $350 million fine to the Office of the Comptroller of the Currency and settle the suit filed against it by Picard for $543 million.

=== 2016 ===
In November 2016, JPMorgan Chase agreed to pay $264 million in fines to settle civil and criminal charges involving a systematic bribery scheme spanning 2006 to 2013 in which the bank secured business deals in Hong Kong by agreeing to hire hundreds of friends and relatives of Chinese government officials, resulting in more than $100 million in revenue for the bank.

=== 2017 ===
In January 2017, the United States sued the company, accusing it of discriminating against "thousands" of black and Hispanic mortgage borrowers between 2006 and at least 2009.

=== 2018 ===
On December 26, 2018, as part of an investigation by the U.S. Securities and Exchange Commission (SEC) into abusive practices related to American depositary receipts (ADRs), JPMorgan agreed to pay more than $135 million to settle charges of improper handling of "pre-released" ADRs without admitting or denying the SEC's findings. The sum consisted of $71 million in ill-gotten gains plus $14.4 million in prejudgment interest and an additional penalty of $49.7 million.

=== 2020 ===
On May 14, 2020, Financial Times, citing a report which revealed how companies are treating employees, their supply chains and other stakeholders, during the COVID-19 pandemic, documented that J.P. Morgan Asset Management alongside Fidelity Investments and Vanguard have been accused of paying lip services to cover human rights violations. The UK based media also referenced that a few of the world's biggest fund houses took the action to lessen the impact of abuses, such as modern slavery, at the companies they invest in. J.P. Morgan, in responding to the report, said that it took "human rights violations very seriously" and "any company with alleged or proven violations of principles, including human rights abuses, is scrutinized and may result in either enhanced engagement or removal from a portfolio."

In September 2020, the company admitted that it manipulated precious metals futures and government bond markets in a span period of eight years. It settled with the United States Department of Justice, U.S. Securities and Exchange Commission, and the Commodity Futures Trading Commission for $920 million. J.P. Morgan will not face criminal charges, however, it will launch into a deferred prosecution agreement for three years.

=== 2022–2023 ===
On November 24, 2022, two women who accused Jeffrey Epstein of sex trafficking and sexual abuse also sued JPMorgan and Deutsche Bank, accusing them of benefiting and closing their eyes to Epstein's sex trafficking operations. According to the lawsuits, banks knew that Epstein's accounts were used to finance sex trafficking crimes. In June 2023, after the allegations reached class-action status, the parties reached a settlement, with JPMorgan agreeing to pay $290 million.

In September 2023, JPMorgan agreed to a $75 million settlement with the United States Virgin Islands Department of Justice for its alleged facilitation and failure to notify law enforcement of Epstein's illegal activities.

Epstein's relationship with J.P. Morgan went back a long time. In 2003, J.P. Morgan earned $8 million in fees from Epstein. J.P. Morgan allowed Epstein to keep accounts at the bank, even amid internal concerns that Epstein was using the accounts for illicit activities. The bank maintained its relationship with Epstein even after his 2011 conviction and incarceration.

=== 2024 ===
On April 24, after Russian state-owned VTB Bank filed suit against JPMorgan to recoup assets frozen under international sanctions during the Russian invasion of Ukraine, a Russian court ordered the seizure of JPMorgan funds totalling $439.5 million. JPMorgan launched a countersuit the following day, citing its inability to reclaim VTB's stranded US funds. On April 26, a Russian court authorized the seizure of $13.34 million of assets held in Russia by a European subsidiary of JPMorgan and Commerzbank.

In July, JPMorgan Chase & Co. and its affiliates became substantial holders in Telix Pharmaceuticals Ltd., acquiring a 5.04% voting power with 16,881,167 ordinary shares.

On October 31, JPMorgan Chase agreed to pay $151 million to resolve five U.S. SEC enforcement cases, including allegations of misleading brokerage disclosures

On December 2, JPMorgan Chase was fined S$2.4 million by the Monetary Authority of Singapore after providing inaccurate and incomplete information to clients in 24 over-the-counter bond transactions by relationship managers, overcharging the clients and refusing to pay back the money difference from the pre-agreed spreads to the spreads given to clients.

=== 2025 ===
In November 2025, JPMorgan Chase unveiled details of its proposed office block in Canary Wharf, London. The plans propose that the new space would have a floor space of three million square feet, more than double that of the Shard.

In December 2025, JPMorgan Chase was fined $45 million by Germany's BaFin after its Frankfurt based subsidiary failed to submit suspicious transaction reports.

=== 2026 ===
In 2026, JP Morgan Chase operated an account for Donald Trump's Board of Peace. By May 2026, the Board of Peace had no funds in its official World Bank account, despite $17 billion in pledges by member states. Donations had gone into a JPMorgan account with no oversight.

== Financial data ==
Financial data in billions of US dollars and employee data in thousands
Year	1998	1999	2000	2001	2002	2003	2004	2005	2006	2007	2008	2009	2010	2011	2012	2013	2014	2015	2016	2017	2018	2019	2020	2021	2022	2023
Revenue	25.87	31.15	33.19	29.34	29.61	33.19	42.74	54.25	62.00	71.37	67.25	100.4	102.7	97.23	97.03	96.61	94.21	93.54	95.67	99.62	109.03	115.40	119.54	121.65	128.69	158.10
Net income	4.745	7.501	5.727	1.694	1.663	6.719	4.466	8.483	14.44	15.37	5.605	11.73	17.37	18.98	21.28	17.92	21.76	24.44	24.73	24.44	32.47	36.43	29.13	48.33	37.68	49.55
Assets	626.9	667.0	715.3	693.6	758.8	770.9	1,157	1,199	1,352	1,562	2,175	2,032	2,118	2,266	2,359	2,416	2,573	2,352	2,491	2,534	2,623	2,687	3,386	3,743	3,666	3,875
Equity	35.10	35.06	42.34	41.10	42.31	46.15	105.7	107.2	115.8	123.2	166.9	165.4	176.1	183.6	204.1	210.9	231.7	247.6	254.2	255.7	256.5	261.3	279.4	294.1	292.3	327.9
Capitalization						75.03	138.7	138.4	167.2	147.0	117.7	164.3	165.9	125.4	167.3	219.7	232.5	241.9	307.3	366.3	319.8	429.9	387.5			
Headcount						96.37	161.0	168.8	174.4	180.7	225.0	222.3	239.8	260.2	259.0	251.2	241.4	234.6	243.4	252.5	256.1	257.0	255.4	271.0	293.7	309.9

Note: Financial data in billions of US dollars and employee data in thousands. For years 1998, 1999, and 2000 figures are combined for Chase Manhattan and J.P. Morgan & Co., for consistency, pre-dating their official merger in 2000. The data is sourced from the company's SEC Form 10-K from 1998 to 2020.

== Structure ==
The corporate structure of JPMorgan Chase & Co. has changed throughout its history through various mergers and acquisitions as well as geographic expansion. In the United States, it owns and operates two key legal subsidiaries:

- Chase Bank
- JPMorgan Securities, LLC.

The modern JPMorgan Chase is broken up into the following three business segments:

- Consumer and Community Banking (CCB) (Chase)
- Asset and Wealth Management (AWM) (J.P. Morgan)
- Commercial and Investment Banking (CIB) (J.P. Morgan & Chase)

=== JPMorgan Europe, Ltd. ===
The company, known previously as Chase Manhattan International Limited, was founded on September 18, 1968. In August 2008, the bank announced plans to construct a new European headquarters at Canary Wharf, London. These plans were subsequently suspended in December 2010, when the bank announced the purchase of a nearby existing office tower at 25 Bank Street for use as the European headquarters of its investment bank. 25 Bank Street had originally been designated as the European headquarters of Enron and was subsequently used as the headquarters of Lehman Brothers International. The regional office is in London with offices in Bournemouth, Glasgow, and Edinburgh for asset management, private banking, and investment banking. In September 2021, JPMorgan Chase entered the UK retail banking market by launching an app-based current account and savings account under the Chase UK brand.

=== Acquisition history ===
The following is an illustration of the company's major mergers and acquisitions and historical predecessors, although this is not a comprehensive list:

- JPMorgan Chase & Co.
  - JPMorgan Chase (merged 2000)
    - Chase Manhattan Bank (merged 1996)
      - Chemical Bank (merged 1996)
        - Chemical Bank (reorganized 1988)
          - The Chemical Bank of New York (est. 1823)
          - Citizens National Bank (est. 1851, acq. 1920)
          - Corn Exchange Bank (est. 1852, acq. 1954)
          - New York Trust Company (acq. 1959)
          - Texas Commerce Bank (est. 1866, acq. 1986)
        - Manufacturers Hanover (merged 1961)
          - Manufacturers Trust Company (est. 1905)
          - Hanover Bank (est. 1873)
      - Chase Manhattan Bank (merged 1955)
        - The Bank of the Manhattan Company (est. 1799)
        - Chase National Bank of the City of New York (est. 1877)
    - J.P. Morgan & Co. (formerly Morgan Guaranty Trust) (merged 1959)
      - Guaranty Trust Company of New York (est. 1866)
      - J.P. Morgan & Co. (est. 1895)
  - Bank One (merged 2004)
    - Banc One Corp. (merged 1968)
      - City National Bank & Trust Company
      - Farmers Saving & Trust Company
    - First Chicago NBD (merged 1995)
      - First Chicago Corp. (est. 1863)
      - NBD Bancorp. (formerly National Bank of Detroit) (est. 1933)
    - Louisiana's First Commerce Corp.
  - Bear Stearns (est. 1923; acq. 2008)
  - Washington Mutual (acq. 2008)
    - Washington Mutual (founded 1889)
    - Great Western Bank (acq. 1997)
    - H. F. Ahmanson & Co. (acq. 1998)
    - Bank United of Texas (acq. 2001)
    - Dime Bancorp, Inc. (acq. 2002)
    - Providian Financial (acq. 2005)
  - First Republic Bank (est. 1985; acq. 2023)

== Political contributions ==
JPMorgan Chase's political action committee (PAC), registered as the "JPMORGAN CHASE & CO. FEDERAL POLITICAL ACTION COMMITTEE", and its employees contributed $2.6 million to federal campaigns in 2014 and financed its lobbying team with $4.7 million in the first three-quarters of 2014. JPMorgan's giving has been focused on Republicans, with 62 percent of its donations going to GOP recipients in 2014. 78 House Democrats received campaign cash from JPMorgan's PAC in the 2014 cycle at an average of $5,200 and a total of 38 of the Democrats who voted for the 2015 spending bill took money from JPMorgan's PAC in 2014. JPMorgan Chase's PAC made maximum donations to the Democratic Congressional Campaign Committee and the leadership PACs of Steny Hoyer and Jim Himes in 2014.

== Climate change ==
JPMorgan has come under criticism for investing in new fossil fuels projects since the Paris climate change agreement. From 2016 to the first half of 2019 it provided $75 billion (£61 billion) to companies expanding in sectors such as fracking and Arctic oil and gas exploration. According to Rainforest Action Network its total fossil fuel financing was $64 billion in 2018, $69 billion in 2017 and $62 billion in 2016. From 2015, which is when the Paris Agreement was adopted, until 2021, JP Morgan Chase provided $317 billion in fossil fuel financing; 33% more than any other bank. On October 21, 2021, JP Morgan Chase joined the Net-Zero Banking Alliance, which supports "the global transition of the real economy to net-zero emissions".

An internal study, 'Risky business: the climate and macroeconomy', by bank economists David Mackie and Jessica Murray was leaked in early‑2020. The report, dated 14 January 2020, states that under our current unsustainable trajectory of climate change "we cannot rule out catastrophic outcomes where human life as we know it is threatened". JPMorgan subsequently distanced itself from the content of the study.

In May 2023, JPMorgan Chase announced that it would purchase $200 million in carbon credits representing 800,000 metric tons of carbon dioxide removal (CDR) from multiple companies (including Climeworks and Charm Industrial) after announcing the previous month that it would join the Frontier CDR initiative formed by Alphabet Inc., McKinsey & Company, Meta Platforms, Shopify, and Stripe, Inc. under a $925 million advance market commitment to the CDR industry the previous year.

In November 2024, JPMorgan Chase said it was seeking opportunities to finance the early shutdown of coal-fired power plants. According to Bloomberg, "there's a growing effort to provide the funding needed to help wean energy systems off the fossil fuel. Closing coal plants early, however, is both complex and costly, particularly in emerging economies."

== Offices ==
The old Chase Manhattan Bank's headquarters were at One Chase Manhattan Plaza (now 28 Liberty Street) in Lower Manhattan, the current temporary world headquarters for JPMorgan Chase & Co. are located at 383 Madison Avenue. In 2018, JPMorgan announced it would demolish the current headquarters building at 270 Park Avenue, which was also Union Carbide's former headquarters, to make way for a newer building at 270 Park Avenue that will be 681 feet (208 m) taller than the previous building. Demolition was completed in the spring of 2021, and the new building was scheduled to be completed in 2025. The replacement 1,388 feet (423 m) and 70-story headquarters will contain 2,500,000 square feet (230,000 m^{2}), and be able to fit 15,000 employees, whereas the current headquarters fits 6,000 employees in a space that has a capacity of 3,500. The new headquarters is part of the East Midtown rezoning plan.

When construction is completed in 2025, the headquarters will then move back into the new building at 270 Park Avenue. As the new headquarters is replaced, the bulk of North American operations take place in five nearby buildings on or near Park Avenue in New York City: the former Bear Stearns Building at 383 Madison Avenue (just south of 270 Park Avenue), the former Chemical Bank Building at 277 Park Avenue just to the east, 237 Park Avenue, and 390 Madison Avenue. The bank entered into an agreement to purchase 250 Park Avenue in July 2024. In October 2025, the company opened its new headquarters in New York, after six years of redevelopment. The new development has 2.5 million square feet of office space and reportedly cost $3 billion.

Approximately 11,050 employees are located in Columbus, Ohio, at the McCoy Center, the former Bank One Corporation offices. The building is the largest JPMorgan Chase & Co. facility in the world and the second-largest single-tenant office building in the United States behind The Pentagon. The bank moved some of its operations to the JPMorgan Chase Tower in Houston, when it purchased Texas Commerce Bank. The Global Corporate Bank's main headquarters are in London, with regional headquarters in Hong Kong, New York and São Paulo.

The Card Services division has its headquarters in Wilmington, Delaware, with Card Services offices in Elgin, Illinois, Springfield, Missouri, San Antonio, Texas, Mumbai, India, and Cebu, Philippines. Additional large operation centers are located in Phoenix, Arizona, Los Angeles, California, Newark, Delaware, Orlando, Florida, Tampa, Florida, Jacksonville, Florida; Brandon, Florida; Indianapolis, Indiana; Louisville, Kentucky, Brooklyn, New York, Rochester, New York, Columbus, Ohio, Dallas, Texas, Fort Worth, Texas, Plano, Texas, and Milwaukee, Wisconsin. Operation centers in Canada are located in Burlington, Ontario, and Toronto, Ontario.

Additional offices and technology operations are located in Manila, Philippines, Cebu, Philippines, Mumbai, India, Bangalore, India, Hyderabad, India, New Delhi, India, Buenos Aires, Argentina, São Paulo, Mexico City, Mexico, and Jerusalem, Israel. In late 2017, JPMorgan Chase opened a new global operations center in Warsaw, Poland. The Asia Pacific headquarters for JPMorgan is located in Hong Kong at Chater House.

Operations centers in the United Kingdom are located in Bournemouth, Edinburgh, Glasgow, London, Liverpool, and Swindon. The London location also serves as the European headquarters.

=== Gallery ===
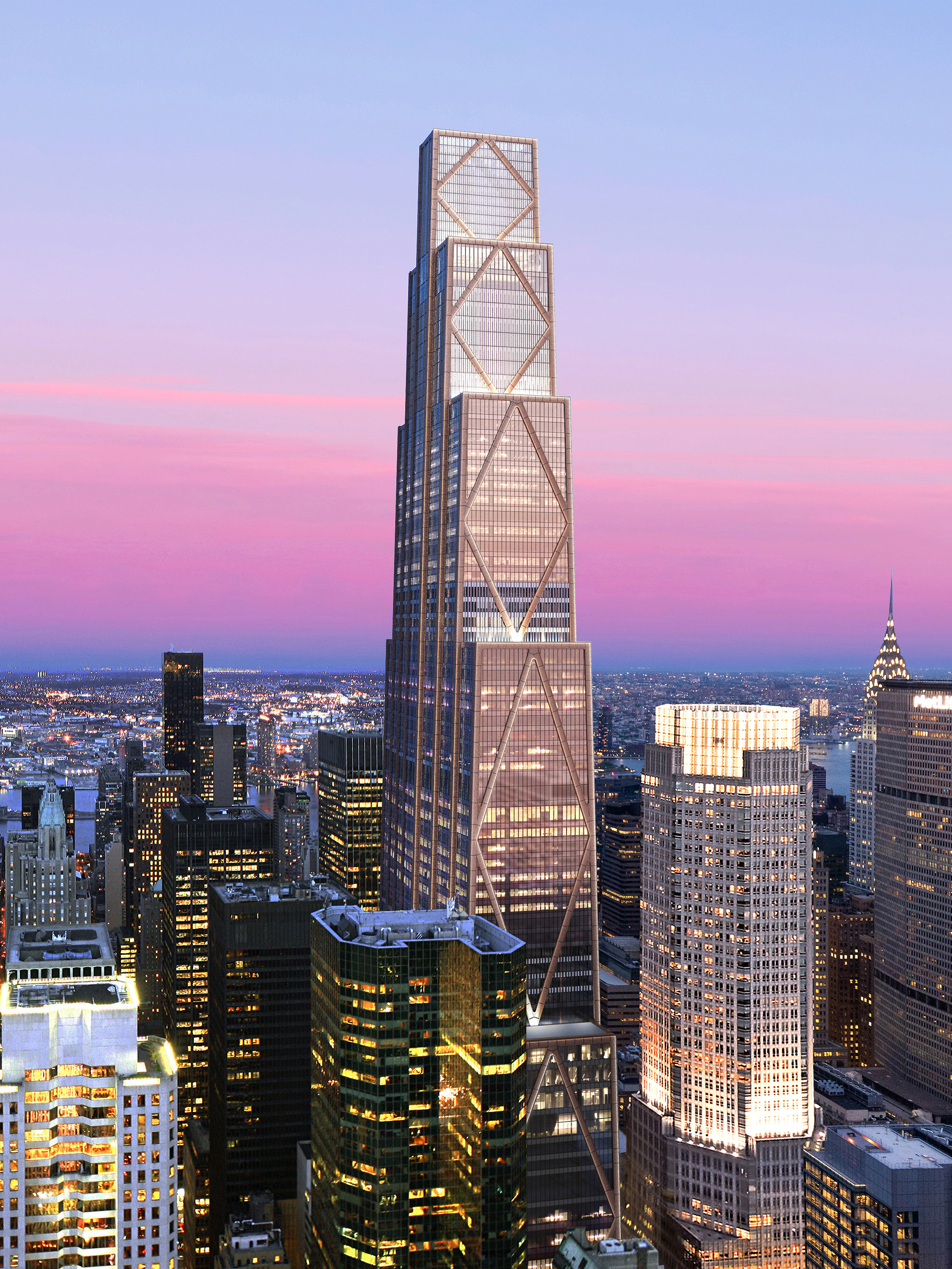
JPMorgan Chase World Headquarters
270 Park Avenue
New York City

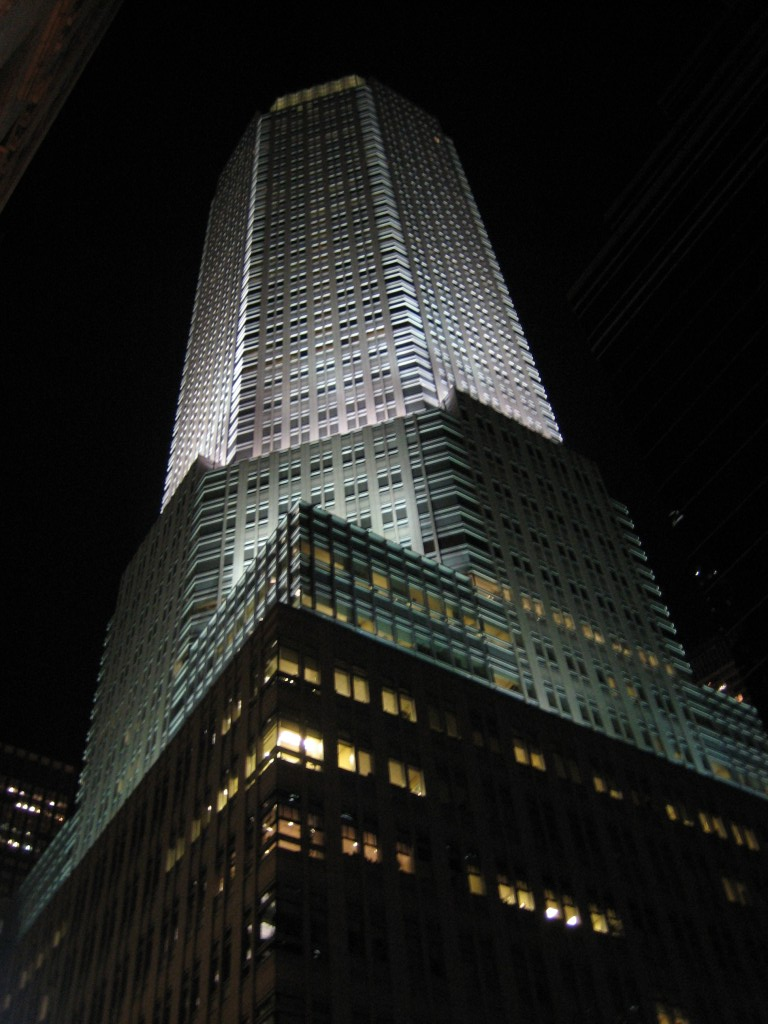
383 Madison Avenue
New York City

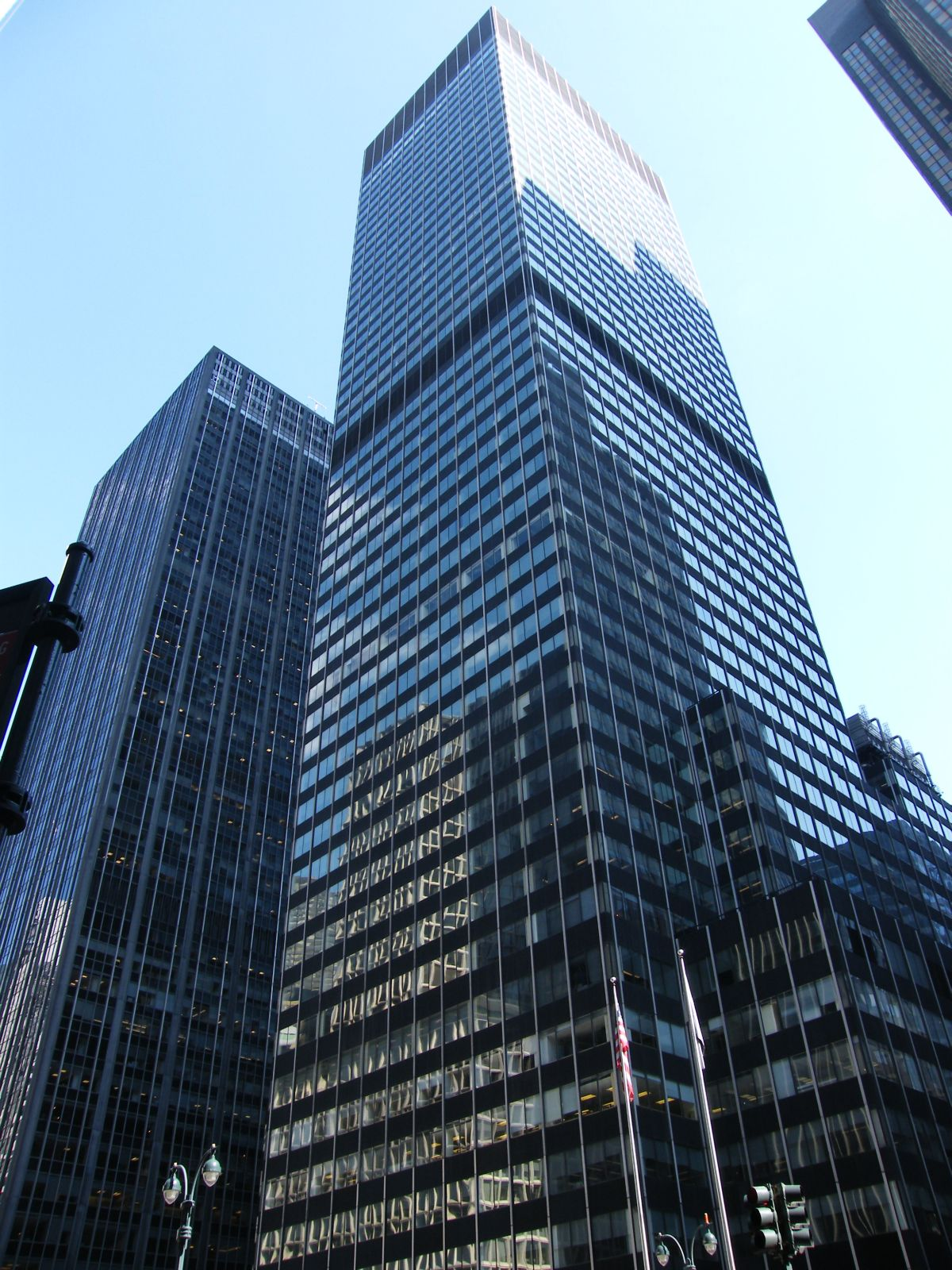
277 Park Avenue
New York City

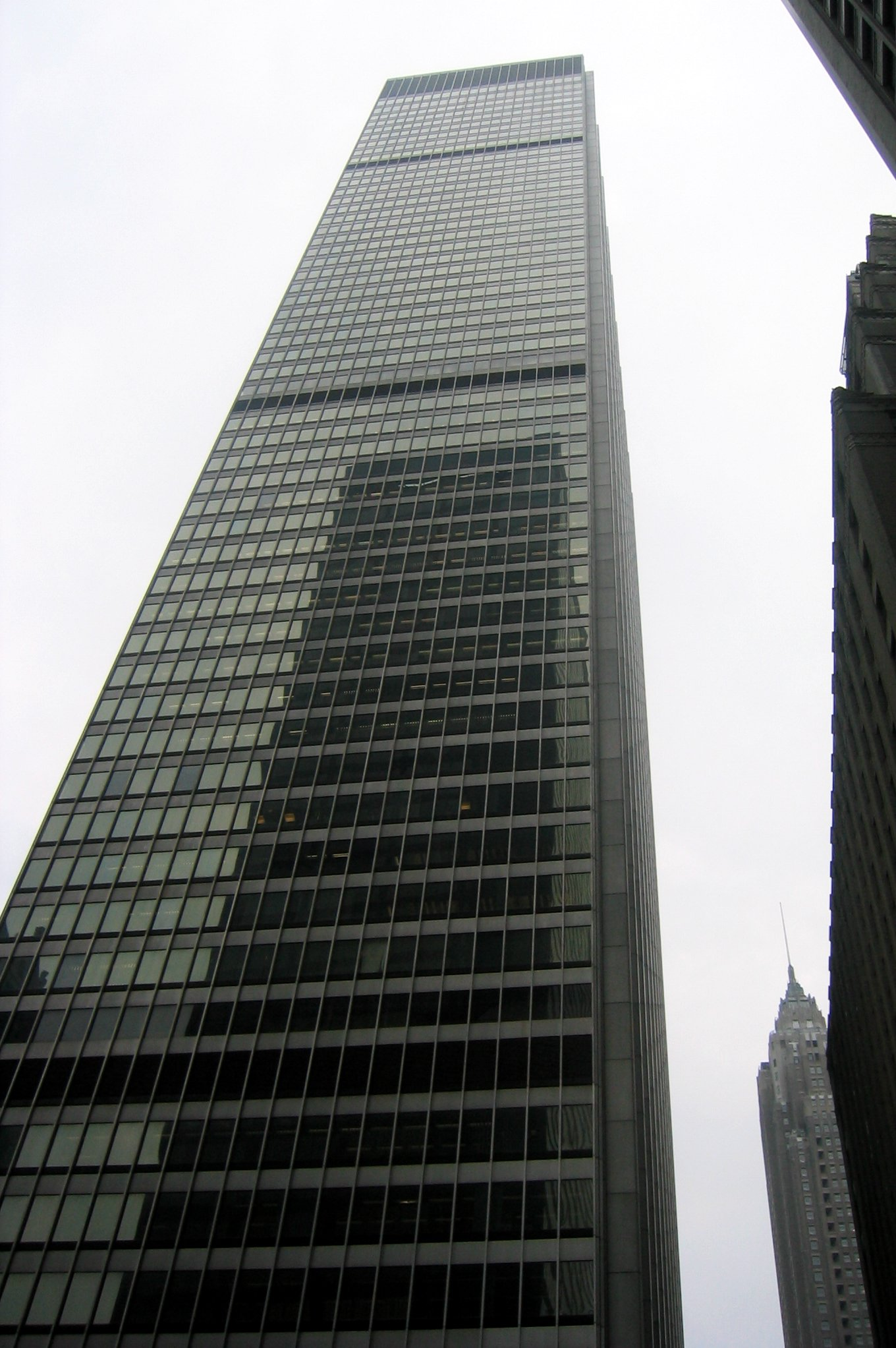
28 Liberty Street
New York City

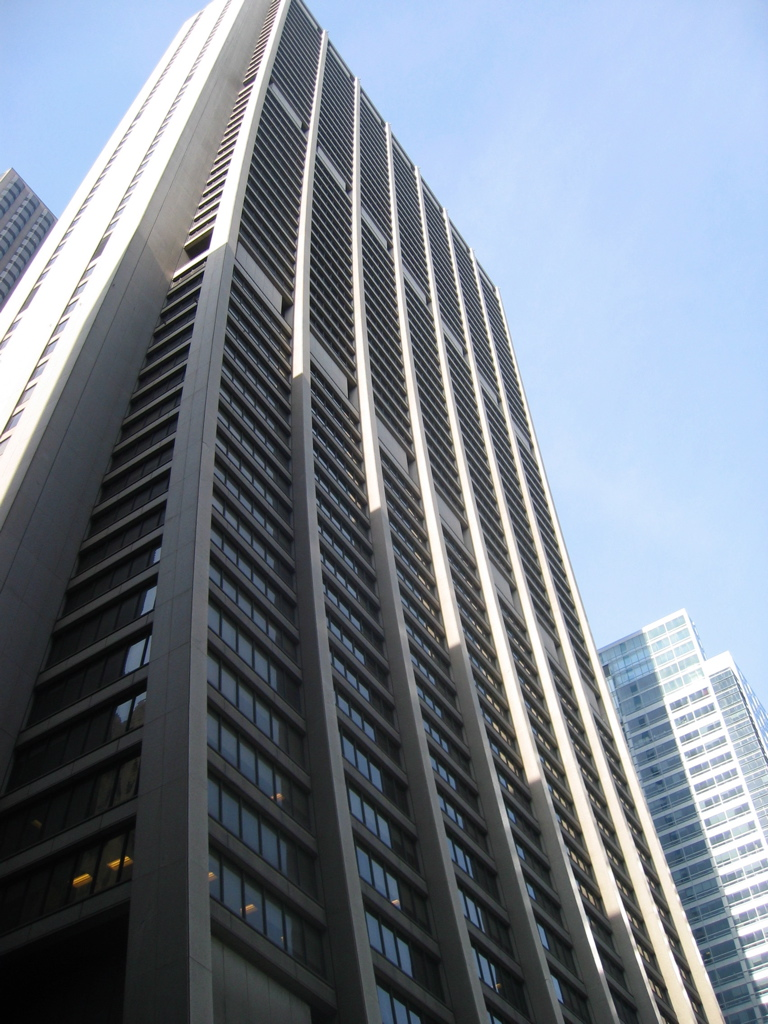
Chase Tower
Chicago, Illinois

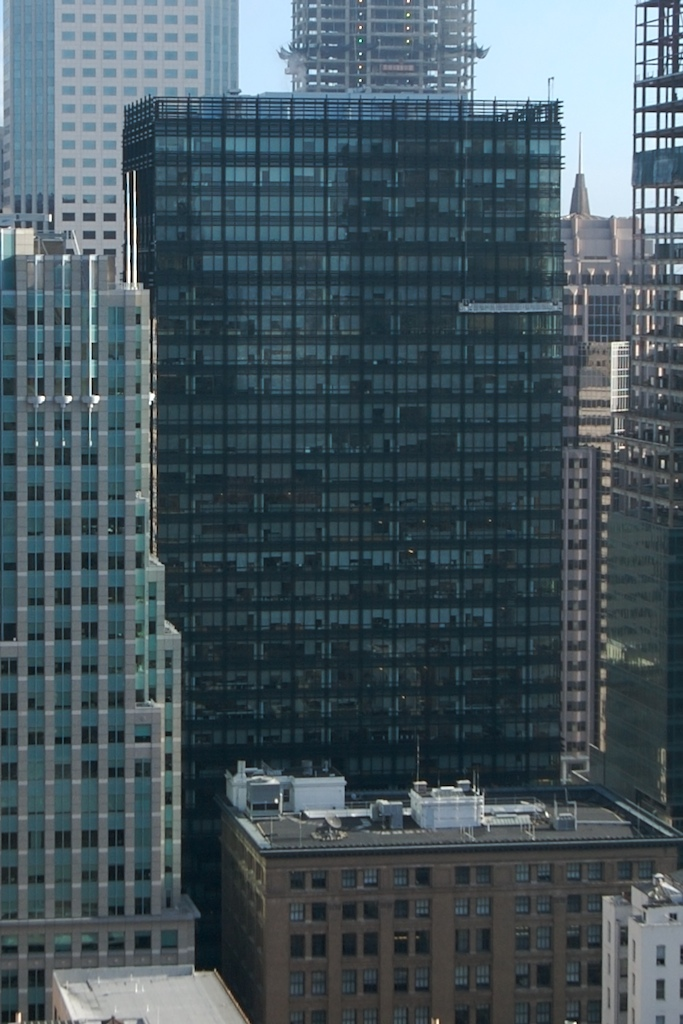
JPMorgan Chase Building
San Francisco, California

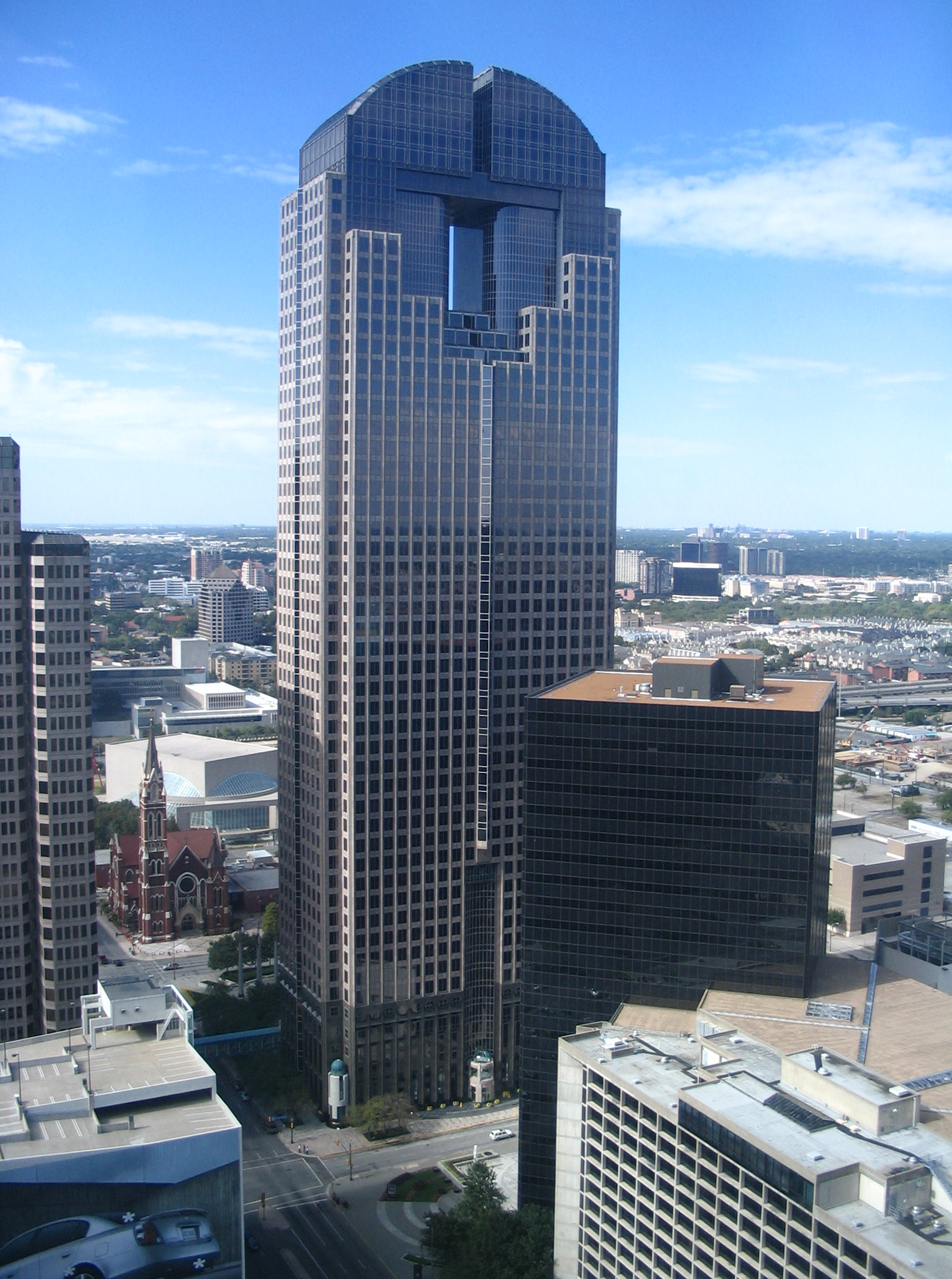
Chase Tower
Dallas, Texas

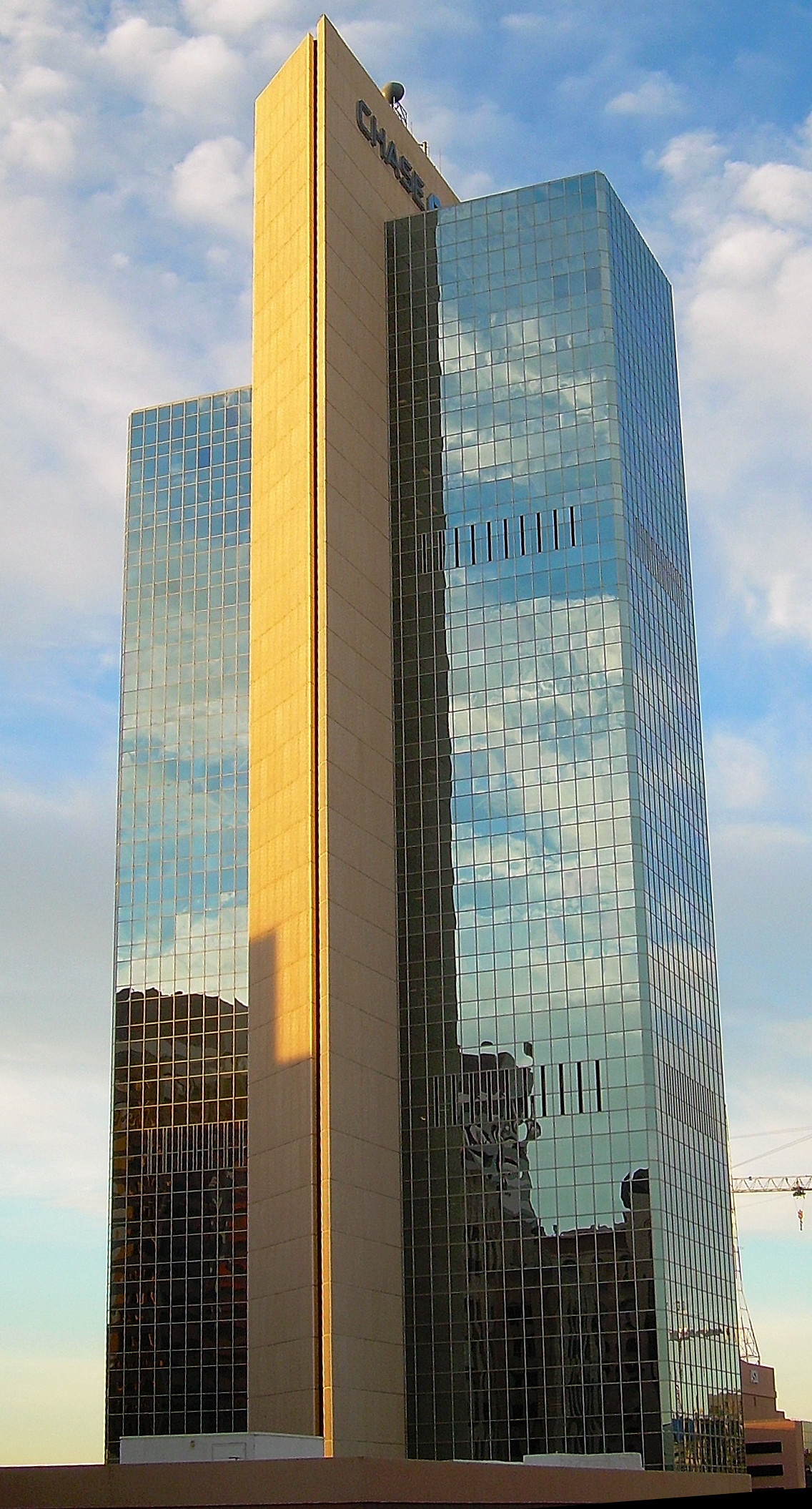
Chase Tower
Phoenix, Arizona

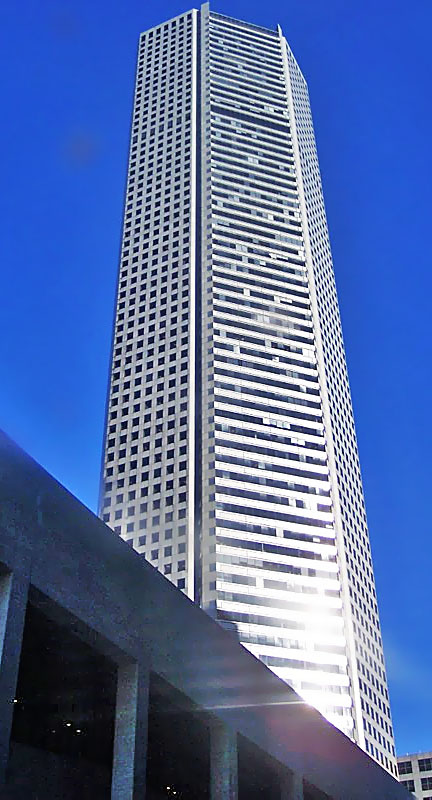
JPMorgan Chase Tower
Houston, Texas

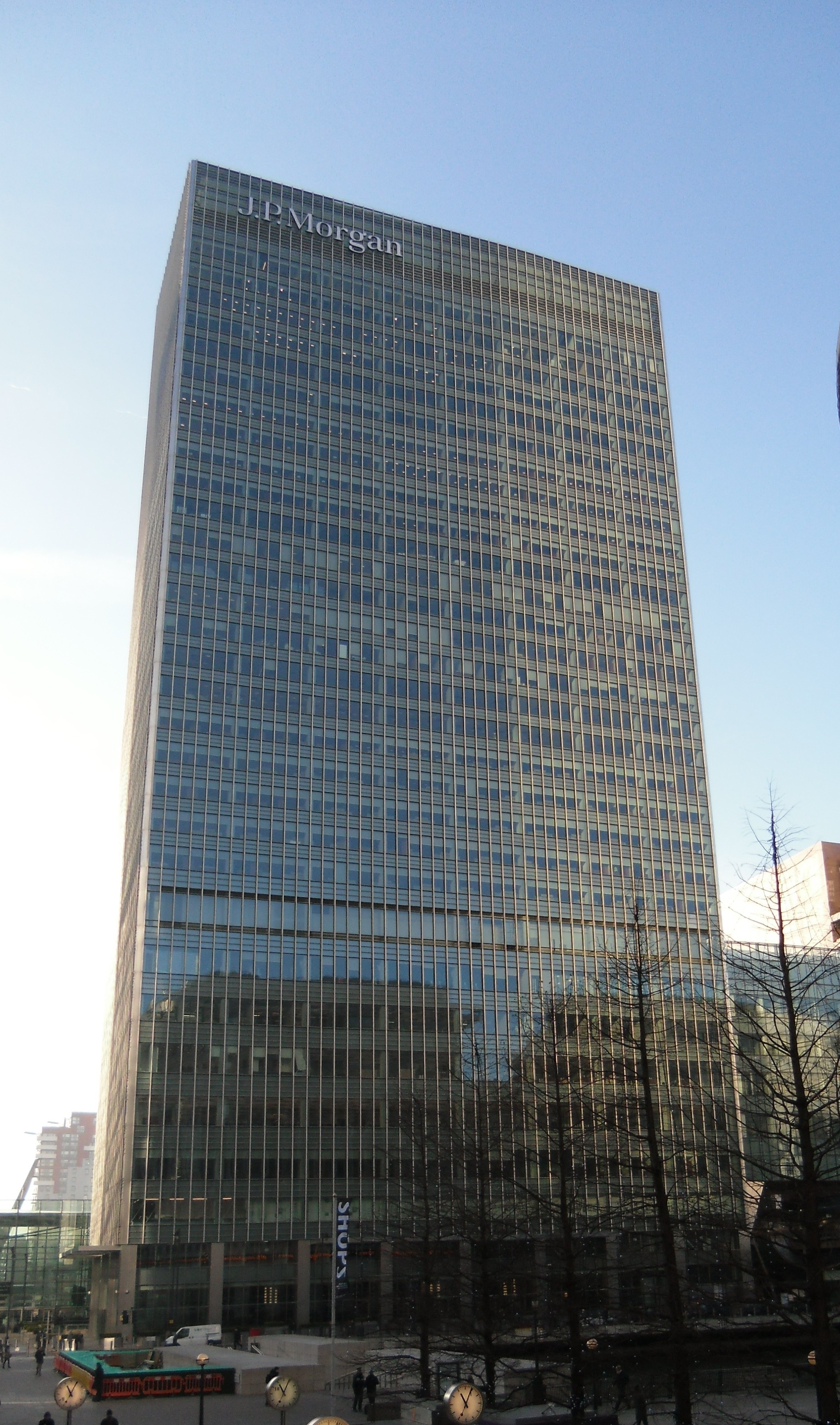
25 Bank Street
London, United Kingdom

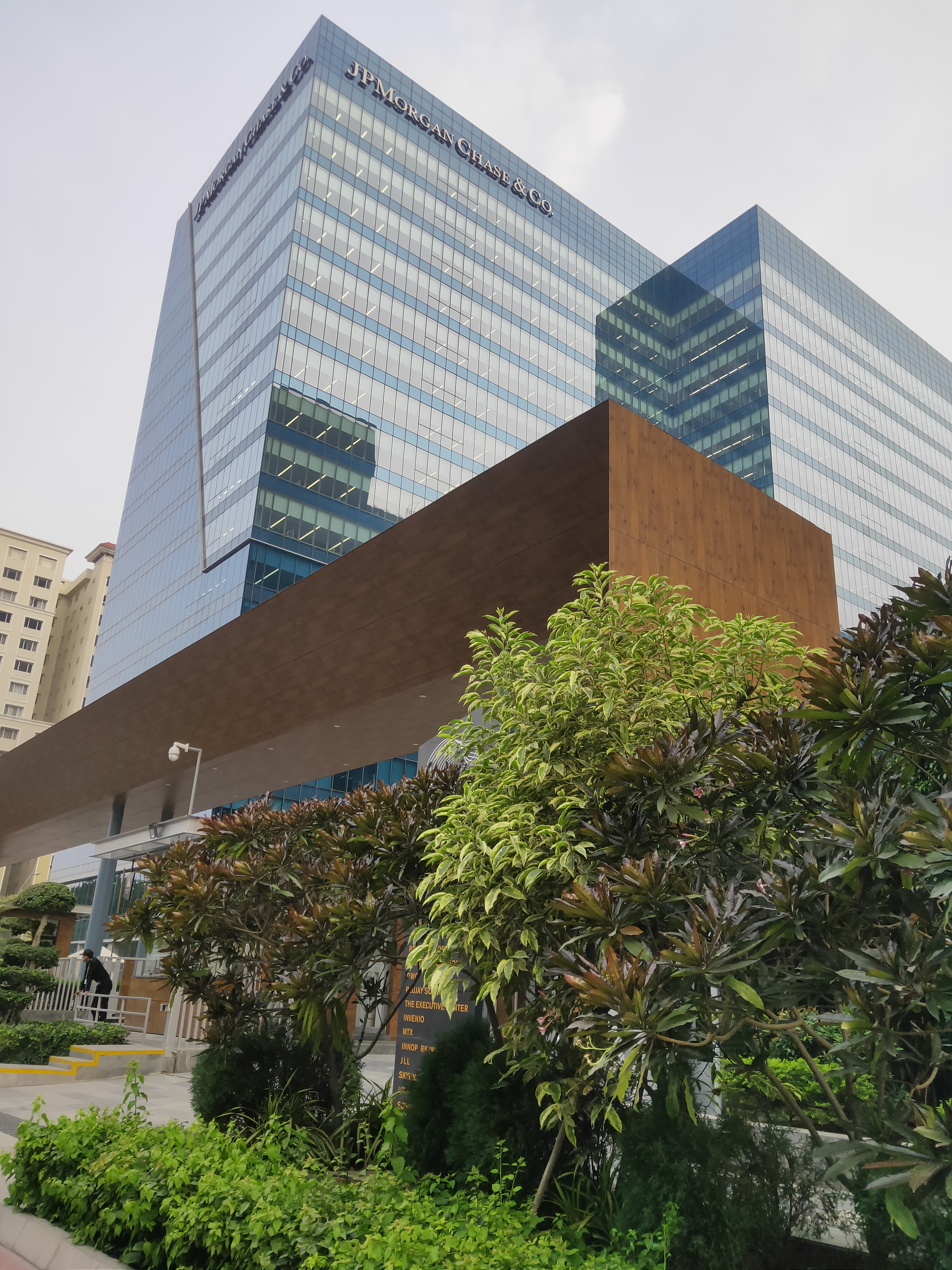
JPMorgan Chase & Co. Tower
Hyderabad, Telangana, India

== Credit derivatives ==
The derivatives team at JPMorgan, led by Blythe Masters, was a pioneer in the invention of credit derivatives such as the credit default swap. The first CDS was created to allow Exxon to borrow money from JPMorgan while JPMorgan transferred the risk to the European Bank of Reconstruction and Development. JPMorgan's team later created the 'BISTRO', a bundle of credit default swaps that was the progenitor of the Synthetic CDO. As of 2013 JPMorgan had the largest credit default swap and credit derivatives portfolio by total notional amount of any US bank.

=== 2012 CDS trading loss ===
In April 2012, hedge fund insiders became aware that the market in credit default swaps was possibly being affected by the activities of Bruno Iksil, a trader for JPMorgan Chase & Co., referred to as "the London whale" in reference to the huge positions he was taking. Heavy opposing bets to his positions are known to have been made by traders, including another branch of J.P. Morgan, who purchased the derivatives offered by J.P. Morgan in such high volume. Early reports were denied and minimized by the firm in an attempt to minimize exposure. Major losses, $2 billion, were reported by the firm in May 2012, in relation to these trades and updated to $4.4 billion on July 13, 2012. The disclosure, which resulted in headlines in the media, did not disclose the exact nature of the trading involved, which remained in progress as of June 28, 2012, and continued to produce losses which could total as much as $9 billion under worst-case scenarios. In the end, the trading produced actual losses of only $6 billion. The item traded, possibly related to CDX IG 9, an index based on the default risk of major U.S. corporations, has been described as a "derivative of a derivative". On the company's emergency conference call, JPMorgan Chase chairman and CEO Jamie Dimon said the strategy was "flawed, complex, poorly reviewed, poorly executed, and poorly monitored". The episode was investigated by the Federal Reserve, the SEC, and the FBI.

Fines levied regarding the 2012 JPMorgan Chase trading loss
Regulator	Nation	Fine
Office of the Comptroller of the Currency	US	$300m
Securities and Exchange Commission	US	$200m
Federal Reserve	US	$200m
Financial Conduct Authority	UK	£138m ($220m US)

On September 18, 2013, JPMorgan Chase agreed to pay a total of $920 million in fines and penalties to American and UK regulators for violations related to the trading loss and other incidents. The fine was part of a multiagency and multinational settlement with the Federal Reserve, Office of the Comptroller of the Currency and the Securities and Exchange Commission in the United States and the Financial Conduct Authority in the UK. The company also admitted breaking American securities law. The fines amounted to the third biggest banking fine levied by US regulators, and the second-largest by UK authorities. As of September 19, 2013, two traders face criminal proceedings. It is also the first time in several years that a major American financial institution has publicly admitted breaking the securities laws.

A report by the SEC was critical of the level of oversight from senior management on traders, and the FCA said the incident demonstrated "flaws permeating all levels of the firm: from portfolio level right up to senior management". On the day of the fine, the BBC reported from the New York Stock Exchange that the fines "barely registered" with traders there, the news had been an expected development, and the company had prepared for the financial hit.

== Art collection ==
The collection was begun in 1959 by David Rockefeller, and comprises over 30,000 objects, of which over 6,000 are photographic-based, as of 2012 containing more than one hundred works by Middle Eastern and North African artists. The One Chase Manhattan Plaza building was the original location at the start of collection by the Chase Manhattan Bank, the current collection containing both this and also those works that the First National Bank of Chicago had acquired prior to assimilation into the JPMorgan Chase organization. L. K. Erf has been the director of acquisitions of works since 2004 for the bank, whose art program staff is completed by an additional three full-time members and one registrar. The advisory committee at the time of the Rockefeller initiation included A. H. Barr, and D. Miller, and also J. J. Sweeney, R. Hale, P. Rathbone and G. Bunshaft.

== Major sponsorships ==
- Chase Field (formerly Bank One Ballpark), Phoenix, Arizona – Arizona Diamondbacks, MLB
- Chase Center, San Francisco, California – Golden State Warriors, NBA
- Major League Soccer
- Chase Auditorium (formerly Bank One Auditorium) inside of Chase Tower in Chicago, Illinois (formerly Bank One Tower)
- The JPMorgan Chase Corporate Challenge, owned and operated by JPMorgan Chase, is the largest corporate road racing series in the world with over 200,000 participants in 12 cities in six countries on five continents. It has been held annually since 1977 and the races range in size from 4,000 entrants to more than 60,000.
- JPMorgan Chase is the official sponsor of the US Open
- J.P. Morgan Asset Management is the Principal Sponsor of the English Premiership Rugby 7s Series
- Sponsor of the Jessamine Stakes, a two-year-old fillies horse race at Keeneland, Lexington, Kentucky since 2006.
- Chase Center on the Riverfront in Wilmington, Delaware where Joe Biden accepted his election as President of the United States in 2020.
- European Super League (now-defunct)

== Ownership ==
JPMorgan Chase is mainly owned by institutional investors, with over 70% of shares held. The 10 largest shareholder of the bank in December 2023 were:

- The Vanguard Group (9.46%)
- BlackRock (6.66%)
- State Street Corporation (4.35%)
- Morgan Stanley (2.25%)
- Geode Capital Management (1.92%)
- Fidelity Investments (1.83%)
- Bank of America (1.77%)
- Capital International Investors (1.44%)
- Wellington Management Company (1.38%)
- Norges Bank (1.23%)

== Leadership ==
Jamie Dimon is the chairman and CEO of JPMorgan Chase. The acquisition deal of Bank One in 2004, was designed in part to recruit Dimon to JPMorgan Chase. He became chief executive at the end of 2005. Dimon has been recognized for his leadership during the 2008 financial crisis. Under his leadership, JPMorgan Chase rescued two ailing banks during the crisis.

In June 2026, JPMorgan Chase named Doug Petno and Troy Rohrbaugh, co-CEOs of its Commercial & Investment Bank, as co-presidents of the company, in a move widely viewed as part of CEO Jamie Dimon's succession planning process. The company also announced that Marianne Lake, CEO of Consumer and Community Banking, would retire from the company after more than 25 years.

On November 17, 2026, JPMorgan Chase named Bregie de Best as its next chief financial officer, replacing Jeremy Barnum after the bank's first-quarter 2027 results. Before becoming CFO, de Best led the finance team for JPMorgan's Commercial and Investment Bank. She had also held senior positions in corporate banking, investment banking anf markets across the UK and Asia.

After leaving the CFO role, Barnum was expected to take on a new position as vice-chairman of JPMorgan Chase. He planned to stay with the bank until early 2028 to help with the transition and other key projects across the company.

=== Board of directors ===
As of May 1, 2023:

- Jamie Dimon, chairman and CEO of JPMorgan Chase
- Linda Bammann, former JPMorgan and Bank One executive
- Steve Burke, chairman of NBCUniversal
- Brad Smith, vice chair and president of Microsoft
- Alicia Boler Davis, CEO of Alto Pharmacy
- Alex Gorsky, former CEO and chairman of Johnson & Johnson
- Mellody Hobson, CEO of Ariel Investments
- Phebe Novakovic, chairwoman and CEO of General Dynamics
- Virginia Rometty, former chairwoman, president and CEO of IBM
- Michele Buck, former CEO, chairman and president of The Hershey Company
- Mark Weinberger, former global chairman and CEO of EY

=== Senior leadership ===
- Chairman: Jamie Dimon (since January 2007)
- Chief executive: Jamie Dimon (since January 2006)

==== Former chairmen ====
- William B. Harrison Jr. (2000–2006)

==== Former chief executives ====
- William B. Harrison Jr. (2000–2005)

== Notable former employees ==
=== Business ===
- Winthrop Aldrich – son of the late Senator Nelson Aldrich
- Andrew Crockett – former general manager of the Bank for International Settlements (1994–2003)
- Pierre Danon – chairman of Eircom
- Ina Drew – former CIO of JP Morgan Chase
- Dina Dublon – member of the board of directors of Microsoft, Accenture and PepsiCo and former executive vice president and chief financial officer of JPMorgan Chase
- Jacob A. Frenkel – governor of the Bank of Israel
- Maria Elena Lagomasino – member of the board of directors of The Coca-Cola Company and former CEO of JPMorgan Private Bank
- Thomas W. Lamont – acting head of J.P. Morgan & Co. on Black Tuesday
- Charles Li – former CEO of Hong Kong Exchanges and Clearing
- Robert I. Lipp – former CEO of The Travelers Companies
- Marjorie Magner – chairman of Gannett Company
- Henry S. Morgan – co-founder of Morgan Stanley, son of J. P. Morgan Jr. and grandson of financier J. P. Morgan
- David Rockefeller – patriarch of the Rockefeller family
- Charlie Scharf – current CEO of Wells Fargo
- Jes Staley – former CEO of Barclays
- Harold Stanley – former JPMorgan partner, co-founder of Morgan Stanley
- Barry F. Sullivan – former CEO of First Chicago Bank and deputy mayor of New York City
- C. S. Venkatakrishnan – current CEO of Barclays
- Don M. Wilson III – former chief risk officer (CRO) of J. P. Morgan and current member of the board of directors at Bank of Montreal
- Ed Woodward – executive vice-chairman of Manchester United F.C.

=== Politics and public service ===
- Tony Blair – prime minister of the United Kingdom (1997–2007)
- William M. Daley – U.S. Secretary of Commerce (1997–2000), U.S. White House Chief of Staff (2011–2012)
- Michael Forsyth, Baron Forsyth of Drumlean – Secretary of State for Scotland (1995–97)
- Thomas S. Gates Jr. – U.S. Secretary of Defense (1959–61)
- David Laws – UK Chief Secretary to the Treasury (May 2010), Minister of State for Schools
- Rick Lazio – member of the U.S. House of Representatives (1993–2001)
- Antony Leung – Financial Secretary of Hong Kong (2001–03)
- Frederick Ma – Hong Kong Secretary for Commerce and Economic Development (2007–08)
- John J. McCloy – president of the World Bank, U.S. High Commissioner for Germany, chairman of Chase Manhattan Bank, chairman of the Council on Foreign Relations, a member of the Warren Commission, and a prominent United States adviser to all presidents from Franklin D. Roosevelt to Ronald Reagan
- Mahua Moitra – investment banker at JPMorgan Chase, Indian member of Parliament, Lok Sabha
- Dwight Morrow – U.S. Senator (1930–31)
- Margaret Ng – member of the Hong Kong Legislative Council
- Azita Raji – former United States ambassador to Sweden (2016–2017)
- George P. Shultz – U.S. Secretary of Labor (1969–70), U.S. Secretary of Treasury (1972–74), U.S. Secretary of State (1982–89)

=== Other ===
- Kabir Sehgal – multi-Grammy and Emmy winning artist, NYT bestselling author, and former JPMorgan vice president
- R. Gordon Wasson – ethnomycologist and former JPMorgan vice president

== See also ==
- History of the credit default swap
- History of banking in the United States
- J.P. Morgan Reserve Card (Palladium Card)
- Big Four banks

=== Index products ===
- JPMorgan EMBI
- JPMorgan GBI-EM Index
