= Passerelles numériques =

- Formation: 2005
- Type: Non-governmental organization Social Assistance; Non-profit association International Solidarity Organization
- Headquarters: Paris, France
- Location(s): France Cambodia Vietnam Philippines Singapore Hong Kong
- Official language: French, english, cebuano, vietnamese, cambodian
- Board of directors: Michel Cantet; Roland Flouquet-Vilboux; Bruno Grossi; Hélène Gayomali; Aude De Rotalier; Hughes Missonnier; Simmoni De Weck; Duc Ha Duong; Sixtine Darré; Laurence Huret; François Phulpin
- Staff: 77

Passerelles numériques (PN) is a French Non-governmental organization created in 2005 in Cambodia. The organization later expanded its actions and now operates in Cambodia, Vietnam and the Philippines.

Passerelles numériques works to provide disadvantaged youth with a way out of poverty for them and their families by giving them the training to become professionals in the IT sector.

== Objectives ==
The mission of Passerelles numériques is to enable underserved young people to get out of poverty by giving them access to education, technical and vocational training in the digital sector. Passerelles numériques aims to ensure that at least 90% of the young people benefiting from its programs, are employed in a secure job.

The aim is to develop sustainable employability, i.e. the ability to progress, adapt, evolve and change throughout their career. The philosophy of the NGO is to make its beneficiaries actors of their own career path in order to enable them to stay out of the poverty circle. This principle turns up in its values: responsibility, respect, trust, solidarity and demanding approach.

Passerelles numériques supports the SDGs (Sustainable Development Goals). The NGO notably commits for gender equality (SDG 5), quality education (SGD 4) and no poverty (SDG 1).

To ensure gender equity, the organization has made a commitment to take in a minimum of 50% women in its programs. This equalitarian model is in stark contrast to the reality of most IT training courses; for example, in Cambodia, only 6% of IT students at university are women.

== History ==
- 2005: Creation of Passerelles numériques and opening of the first training center in Cambodia.
- 2007: First graduation ceremony in Phnom Penh for 20 students of the Systems and Network Administration program.
- 2009: The program is expanded to Cebu City, in the Philippines.
- 2010: The program is expanded to Vietnam.
- 2012: 1st graduation of 24 students in PN Philippines and 27 students in PN Vietnam.
- 2013: Creation of Passerelles numériques Hong Kong Limited, a charity, run by a team of volunteers, which aims to raise awareness and collect funds to support PN’s actions.
- 2015: Passerelles numériques celebrates its 10 years! Since the beginning, more than 1,500 underprivileged students came through PN’s training program and can now live the life they have chosen.
- 2016: Creation of the legal entity « PN SEA » (South East Asia) in Singapore with an objective of fundraising & awareness to Passerelles numériques’ actions.
- 2017: In December 2017, Michel Cantet becomes Head of the NGO.

== Organisation ==
At the end of 2018, Passerelles numériques employed nearly 69 people, including 8 VSI (Volunteers for International Solidarity).

Passerelles numériques activity is also carried out thanks to the contribution of volunteers (interns, solidarity leave, ambassadors, skill-based sponsorship, etc.). More than 186 participated in the project in 2018.

== Activities ==
Passerelles numériques offers short-term technical and professional training (two or three years) in the sector of information technology to young disadvantaged students.

=== Selection process ===
Each year the Selection teams go through a rigorous 4-step process:

- Information sessions;
- Written exams;
- Motivation interviews;
- Social investigations.

Passerelles numériques selection covers 15 provinces in Cambodia, 7 provinces in central Vietnam and all 18 provinces in the Philippines. In 2018, 10 452 young people participated in Passerelles numériques information sessions; 669 social surveys were conducted and 118 young people were eventually selected.

=== Program ===
The focus is placed on employability, with a curriculum frequently updated to reflect market demands and the employers' needs. Students will benefit from training in IT skills, English language proficiency and soft skills. The program includes practical, hands-on training, and helps them develop problem-solving skills. The curriculum also includes career guidance and on-the-job training in the form of mandatory internships, lasting between 5 months to 1 year, depending on countries.

=== Types of training ===
In Cambodia, PN provides 2 years training either in System and Network Administration or Web programming. At the end of the training, graduates will receive both a PN certificate and an Associate's Degree, recognised by the Ministry of Youth, Education and Sport of Cambodia.

In the Philippines, in partnership with the University of San Carlos, students receive 2.5 years of training in IT. During this training, PN provides a professional life training and other activities enabling them to exalt their soft skill potentials. Graduates received a certificate in Computer Technology delivered by USC and a PN certificate.

In Vietnam, currently, Passerelles numériques Vietnam is working with Danang Vocation Training College to collaborate in the curriculum design and share the training delivery: 3 years training is provided in Software Development and testing. In addition, PN provides a general training in professional skills. At the end of the training, graduating students receive a College degree, recognized by the Vietnamese Ministry of Labor Invalids and Social Affairs and a Passerelles numériques certificate.

== Impacts and results ==
- Since 2005, more than 2,000 young people have graduated from Passerelles numériques programs.
- At the end of the training, more than 96% of the young graduates find a job within 2 to 3 months after graduation.
- In Cambodia, 100% of the students in the 2-year training found employment immediately after the end of their internship in October and before the official graduation ceremony.
- In the Philippines, 46% of third-year students (or 21 students) were hired as full-time employees after the end of their internship.
- In Vietnam, more than 95% of them have found a skilled job and earn, after training, an average of $403 per month, twice as much as the regional minimum wage.
- Once they have found employment, graduates in turn support their families and communities. On average, alumni pay 1/3 of their salary to their families.

== Partnerships ==
Passerelles numériques receives support from its partner companies such as Cisco Systems, Econocom, Avanade France, Econocom, Palo IT, Accenture and the Société Générale Corporate Foundation for Solidarity.

Local partners in each of the operating countries include Synacy (in the Philippines) and Web Essentials (in Cambodia).

Passerelles numériques also benefits from partnerships with local universities. The University of San Carlos in the Philippines supports the formation of Passerelles numériques.
