= Pierre Danon =

French entrepreneur (born 1956)

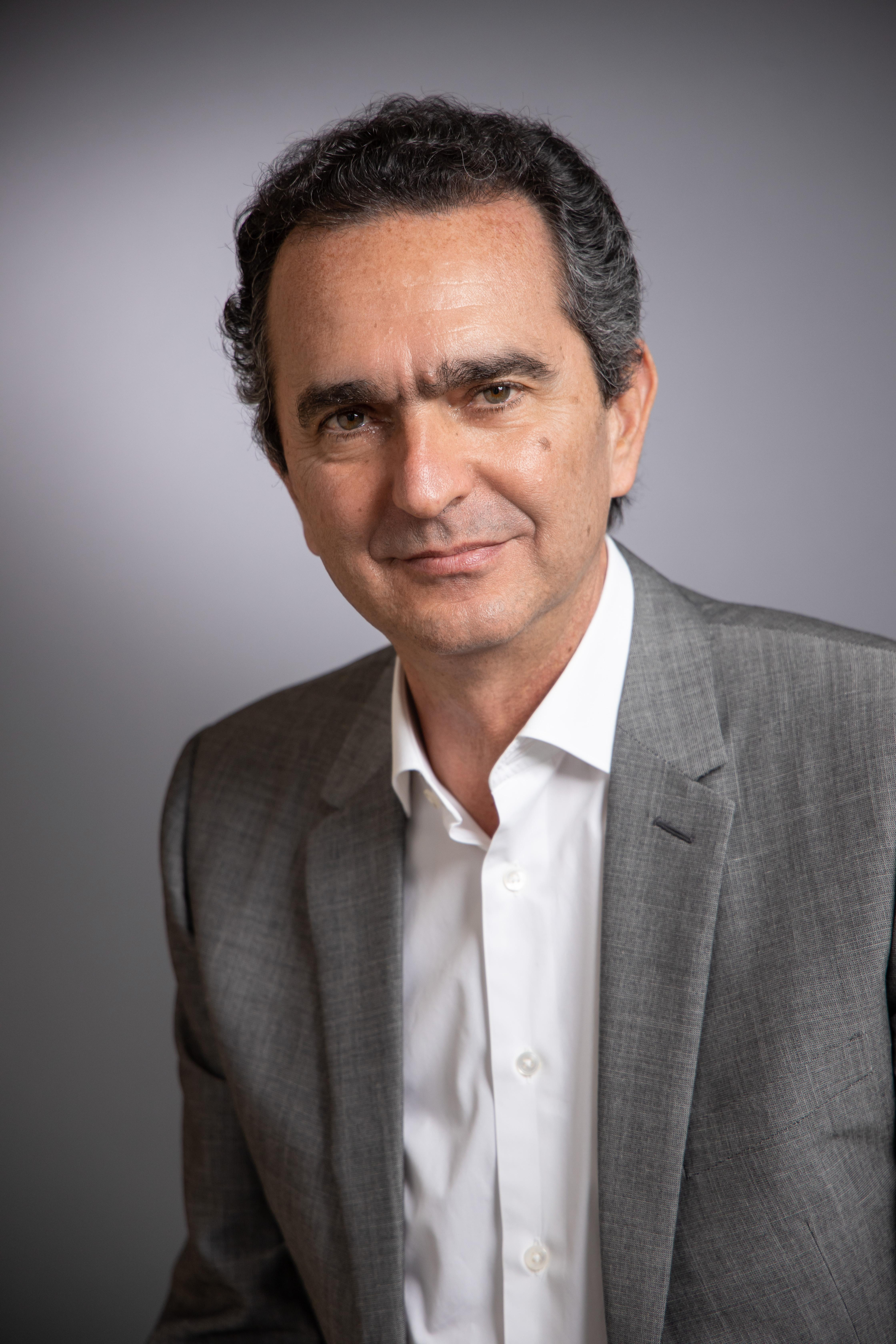
- Born: 1956 (age 69–70)
- Education: École nationale des ponts et chaussées Panthéon-Assas University; HEC Paris
- Occupations: Chairman of SoLocal Group (Paris), Executive Chairman of Volia (Kyiv)

Pierre Danon (born 1956) is a French entrepreneur. He currently serves on the board of directors of several companies in Europe. He is chairman of SoLocal Group in Paris and the executive chairman of Volia in Kyiv.

== Education ==
Danon earned a degree in civil engineering from the École nationale des ponts et chaussées, a Master's in Law degree from Panthéon-Assas University, and an MBA from the Institut Superieur des Affaires (HEC Paris MBA, Paris).

== Career ==
=== Executive management and Chairmanship of listed companies ===
Danon worked for 20 years at Xerox in finance, sales, marketing, customer service, and research. His career, which began in France, extended to various European countries and the United States. In 1998, Danon became President of Xerox Europe, the operational arm of Xerox Corporation in Europe.

In September 2000, Danon was appointed CEO of BT Retail, where he was responsible for relations with over 21 million UK customers from individuals to large and small enterprises. BT Retail then employs 60,000 people, with an annual turnover of around 13.4 billion pounds. Danon also served as a member of the board of directors of British Telecom.

In March 2005, he is appointed chief operating officer of Capgemini Group, a management consulting and IT services group that employs approximately 50,000 people in more than 30 countries, with a total turnover of 6.3 billion euros. Danon successfully turned around Capgemini's business in the United States and stimulated a global approach to delivery in India.

In September 2017, Danon was appointed as chairman of the board of SoLocal Group, the leading French digital company. Following the Covid crisis, he successfully led a substantial financial restructuring from March 2020. The CEO left the company in September 2020 and Danon became chairman and CEO. He recruited a new CEO in April 2021 and then resumed his position as non executive chairman.

=== Executive and non-executive management of private companies ===
In 2006, Danon helped the investment fund Babcock & Brown Capital to take-over Eircom. He served as its president from 2006 to 2008. Eircom employs nearly 8,000 people and offers mobile and fixed line communication services for individuals and businesses in Ireland.

In May 2008, Danon was elected vice-chairman of TDC. In this capacity, he participated in the November 2011 IPO. TDC is the leading provider of communications solutions in Denmark, with a strong presence in Norway, through the cable-operator GET. TDC employs around 9,000 people, with an enterprise value of about 9 billion euros. In March 2017, Danon was elected chairman of the board of TDC. In 2017, TDC was acquired by Macquarie. During the period 2016–2017, TDC delivered a 25% annualised return to its shareholders, and Danon then left the board.

In September 2008, Danon became president of Numericable-Completel a post he held until 2012. The group is the third largest fixed line operator in France and has its own fiber infrastructure. It addresses the consumer market with the cable operator Numericable which delivers quadruple play services and whose network is available to more than 9 million households. Completel covers the corporate market, and is the third largest service provider in France dedicated to enterprises. The turnaround of customer service, strategic acquisitions, and especially the signing of the Bbox Fiber contract with Bouygues Telecom marked Danon's presidency. The group continues since then on its business trajectory until its merger with SFR.

Since May 2011, Danon is also the executive chairman of Volia, cable operator based in Kyiv, Ukraine. The shareholders of Volia are Providence Equity Partners Fund (PEP) and Sigma Bleyser Fund (SBF). Volia delivers its services to nearly one and a half million customers and employs 3,000 people.

In April 2013, Danon engineered the merger between Agrogénération and Harmelia on behalf of SBF, which gave rise to an agroholding with a market capitalization of around 200 million euros, which operates nearly 100,000 hectares in Ukraine. In October 2013, he was elected vice-chairman of the board of AgroGénération and left this position in June 2019.

In September 2017, following the closing of the purchase by PEP of MTG Baltics, Danon became executive chairman of the entity, now called All Media Baltics, strong of 500 people and leader of the free TV and satellite-pay TV in each of the three countries. In December, Danon has recruited a CEO to continue the journey and left the position in December 2019.

=== Non-executive director ===
From 2002 to 2004, Danon was an independent director of the company Hays PLC, one of the world's specialist recruitment firm.

From April 2004 to March 2008, he was non-executive director of Emap Plc, a multimedia company based in the United Kingdom.

Between November 2005 and September 2008, Danon was a senior adviser to EMEA Chairman Walter Gubert at JP Morgan. He provided advice and expertise to the team at JP Morgan and their customers across Europe in the field of telecommunications, media and high technology. Danon was also a member of the advisory board of JPMorgan in Europe.

Since 2006, Danon has been a director of the company Ciel Limited, listed in Port Louis (Mauritius), and which operates in the fields of hospitality, financial services and health services. He is the vice-chairman of the finance activity since 2015.

In October 2011, he was elected non-executive director of Standard Life, an asset management company based in Edinburgh. Standard Life is publicly listed on the London stock exchange and is also part of the FTSE 100. It deals with almost 400 billion euros of financial assets. Danon was the chairman of the investment committee until August 2017. At this time, Standard Life merged with Aberdeen and Danon left the board of directors of the merged entity.

=== Business angel ===
Since 2003, Danon has supported the development of Procontact, a call center with 600 positions based in Mauritius and Madagascar. Starting as an investor, he became its chairman in 2013.

Finally, he is an investor in an Adtech company in Paris, BeOp, where he is a member of the strategic committee.

=== Patronage ===
Danon served as Vice-President of the simple:HEC Foundation from 2003 to 2006.

He also served, from 2005 to the end of 2015, as the vice-president association E-enfance that works to protect children and adolescents on the Internet.

Danon has also been non-executive director of the organization Passerelles numériques, which offers computer training to young people located in disadvantaged areas in Cambodia, Vietnam and the Philippines between 2014 and 2017.

He became in 2015 shareholder of a recently created venture in Paris, Proactive Academy, which offers training to young people in France.

=== Public affairs ===
Danon has also been the campaign deputy director of François Fillon during the Republicans presidential primary in 2016. After Fillon's victory, Danon has led the civil society pole of his presidential election.
