= JPMorgan EMBI =

Set of three bond indices

The JPMorgan Emerging Market Bond Index (EMBI) are a set of three bond indices to track bonds in emerging markets operated by J P Morgan. The indices are the Emerging Markets Bond Index Plus, the Emerging Markets Bond Index Global and the Emerging Markets Bond Global Diversified Index.

== Emerging Markets Bond Index Plus ==
The Emerging Markets Bond Index Plus (EMBI+) tracks total returns for traded external debt instruments (external meaning foreign currency denominated fixed income) in the emerging markets. The regular EMBI index covers U.S.dollar-denominated Brady bonds, loans and Eurobonds. The EMBI+ expands upon J.P.Morgan's original Emerging Markets Bond Index (EMBI), which was introduced in 1992 and covered only Brady bonds. An external debt version, the EMBI+ is the JPMorgan EMBI Global Index

In addition to serving as a benchmark, the EMBI+ provides investors with a definition of the market for emerging markets external-currency debt, a list of the instruments traded, and a compilation of their terms.

The index comprises a set of broker-traded debt instruments widely followed and quoted by several market makers. Instruments in the EMBI+ must have a minimum face value outstanding of $500 million and must meet strict criteria for secondary market trading liquidity.

== Emerging Markets Bond Global Index ==
The J.P.Morgan Emerging Markets Bond Index Global ("EMBI Global") tracks total returns for traded external debt instruments in the emerging markets, and is an expanded version of the JPMorgan EMBI+. As with the EMBI+, the EMBI Global includes U.S.dollar-denominated Brady bonds, loans, and Eurobonds with an outstanding face value of at least $500 million. It covers more of the eligible instruments than the EMBI+ by relaxing somewhat the strict EMBI+ limits on secondary market trading liquidity.

== Emerging Markets Bond Global Diversified Index ==
The EMBI Global Diversified limits the weights of those index countries with larger debt stocks by only including a specified portion of these countries eligible current face amounts of debt outstanding.

== See also ==
- JPMorgan GBI-EM Index
- Bond market index
- Country risk
