= Econocom =

European business-to-business digital services provider

Econocom Group SE
- Traded as: Euronext Brussels since 1986
- Industry: IT Services
- Founded: 1974
- Founder: Jean-Louis Bouchard
- Headquarters: Brussels, Belgium
- Revenue: €2.9 billion (2025)
- Net income: €6.4 million (2025)
- Number of employees: 8,680 (2025)
- Website: Econocom.com

Econocom Group SE is a European business-to-business (B2B) digital services provider specialized in digital transformation for private and public organizations. Founded in 1974 by Jean-Louis Bouchard under the name Europe Computer Systèmes (ECS), the group operates across the digital value chain, including workplace solutions, IT and audiovisual infrastructure, and technology asset financing.

The company operates in 16 countries, employs approximately 8,680 people as of 2025, and reported revenue of €2.9 billion in 2025. It is listed on Euronext Brussels.

== Operations ==
Econocom provides digital transformation services to private companies and public sector organizations. Its activities include the supply, integration, management and financing of IT and audiovisual equipment, as well as associated services such as maintenance, user support and refurbishment.

Since 2023, the group has organized its activities into four main areas: workplace solutions, IT infrastructure and networks, audiovisual solutions, and technology asset financing.

== History ==
=== Inception and early years ===
Jean-Louis Bouchard founded the group in France in 1974 as Europe Computer Systèmes (ECS). In 1986, he sold his stake in ECS France to Société Générale but reacquired all foreign subordinate companies to merge them with Econocom, an American company he had recently acquired. The subsidiaries and the group were renamed Econocom. That same year, Econocom Belgium was listed on the secondary market of the Brussels Stock Exchange. Econocom Distribution acquired Asystel Belgium in 1993, adding IT distribution operations in the Benelux region.

=== International expansion ===
Econocom was listed on the primary market of the Brussels Stock Exchange in 1996. Four years later, it was listed on the secondary market of the Paris Stock Exchange. The group established Econocom Telecom and made an offer for InfoPoint. By 2001, the group employed 2,000 people.

In 2002, Econocom acquired Comdisco-Promo data in France, which focused on administrative and financial IT asset management. This was followed two years later by the acquisition of Signal Service France. By 2005, the group operated in Belgium, France, the Netherlands, Spain, and Italy. Econocom later sold its Swiss subsidiary and closed its financing operations in the United States.

The company entered the telecommunications sector in 2006 by acquiring Avenir Telecom's business division. The following year, Econocom expanded this division by acquiring the business division of Carphone Warehouse France. It also acquired Tecnolease, an Italian IT leasing company. In 2008, it acquired Data bail, a French IT infrastructure funding company. The next year, it opened a nearshore remote service facility in Rabat, Morocco, employing 300 people.

In October 2010, Société Générale sold ECS. Jean-Louis Bouchard, who had founded ECS in 1974, purchased the company and merged it with Econocom. That same year, the group launched "7 Remote Services," a service for migrating IT infrastructure to Microsoft operating systems.

In 2011, Véronique di Benedetto, former Deputy Managing Director of ECS, was appointed Deputy Managing Director of the new group and managing director of Econocom France. Di Benedetto, an ESCP Business School graduate who began her career at IBM, joined the management board alongside Jean-Louis Bouchard, Jean-Philippe Roesch, and Bruno Lemaistre.

Econocom expanded its virtualisation and cloud computing operations in 2012 by acquiring Ermestel in Spain, as well as a stake in the Belgian company Centix. That same year, the group acquired Tactem, a telecom expense management provider, and France Systèmes, an Apple reseller for the education and research sectors. It also acquired Cap Synergy, a French systems integrator focused on network and IT security.

In 2013, Econocom acquired the French systems integrator Exaprobe and announced its "MUTATION 2013 – 2017" strategic plan. In September, the group finalized the acquisition of a majority stake in Osiatis, an infrastructure service provider. This transaction created a digital services entity with about 8,000 employees and €2 billion in revenue. Following the acquisition, Jean-Maurice Fritsch and Bruno Grossi joined the Econocom Executive Board. By November, Econocom had finalized the purchase of the entire share capital of Osiatis.

On 6 January 2014, Georges Croix and Econocom founded Digital Dimension, a cloud and digital services provider. In 2017, the group invested in the venture capital firm Educapital. That same year, they partnered with Microsoft to distribute HoloLens in the European market.

Robert Bouchard became CEO of the Econocom Group in 2018, and Louise Beveridge was appointed Head of Brand. In 2018 Econocom also acquired a majority stake in Altabox, a Spanish omnichannel marketing firm, and introduced "e-vigilante," a robot allegedly used for monitoring industrial sites.

=== History of the brand and logo ===
Econocom logo (1999)

Econocom logo (2003)

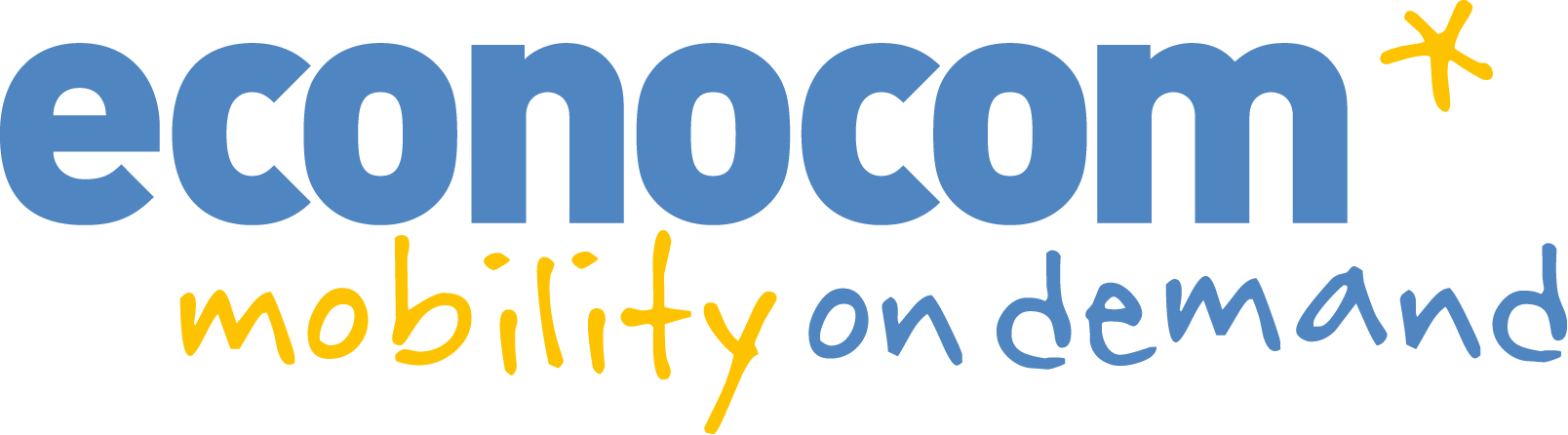
Econocom logo (2007)

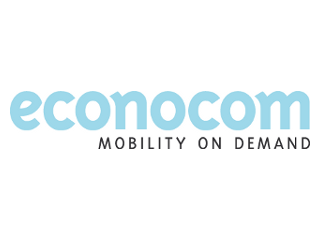
Econocom logo (2011)

Econocom logo (2013–present)

=== Recent developments ===
From 2020, Econocom initiated a refocus on its core activities.

In 2023, the group launched its strategic plan "One Econocom", aimed at strengthening synergies between its business units and improving overall profitability.

The company now structures its operations around four main areas: workplace solutions, infrastructure and networks, audiovisual solutions, and financial services.

In 2025, Econocom expanded its audiovisual activities in Europe through acquisitions including AVANZIA (Spain), ISS AV (Ireland), Smartcomm (United Kingdom), and ICT (Germany). In May 2025, Econocom completed a €225 million Schuldschein private placement.

In December 2025, the group launched shop.econocomfactory.com, an e-commerce website for refurbished IT equipment aimed at professional customers.

== Today ==
Econocom employs approximately 8,680 people as of 2025. The group manages 7 million digital assets.

The company expanded into the "smart solutions" sector in 2012 by launching a joint research and development program with Istituto Superiore Mario Boella in Turin, Italy.

=== Business sectors ===
Since 2023, Econocom has structured its activities around four main areas:

- Workplace solutions
- IT Infrastructure and networks
- Audiovisual solutions
- Technology asset financing

=== International operations ===
Econocom operates in 16 countries across Europe, supporting both private and public sector organisations.

== Governance ==
As of 1 April 2026, Econocom's Executive Committee is composed of the following members:

- Angel Benguigui, Chief Executive Officer and Chairman of the Executive Committee
- Quentin Bouchard, Chief Executive Officer, Global Tech, and CEO of Distribution and Services France
- Israel Garcia, Chief Executive Officer in charge of development and strategic plan, and head of the United Kingdom and Ireland perimeter
- Philippe Renauld, Chief Financial Officer and Head of M&A, and Chairman of Econocom Exaprobe

As of 31 December 2025, the Board of Directors consists of:

- Jean-Louis Bouchard, Chairman of Econocom International BV, Executive Chairman and Founder, Managing Director
- Robert Bouchard, Vice-Chairman and Director
- Angel Benguigui, Chief Executive Officer, Managing Director
- Chantal De Vrieze, Non-Executive Director
- Jean-Philippe Roesch, Non-Executive Director
- Philippe Capron, Independent Director
- Sophie Guieysse, Independent Director
- Marie-Christine Levet, Independent Director
