= Global Shares =

Irish financial tech company

- JP Morgan Workplace Solutions
- Formerly: Global Shares
- Industry: Fintech
- Founded: 2005
- Headquarters: Clonakilty, Cork, Ireland
- Area served: Around the world
- Brands: J.P. Morgan Workplace Solutions
- Number of employees: 800 (2023)
- Parent: J.P. Morgan
- Website: www.globalshares.com

J.P. Morgan Workplace Solutions, formerly known as Global Shares is a fintech company headquartered in Clonakilty, Ireland, managing employee equity plans for startups, tech companies and enterprise brands.

In March 2022, JPMorgan Chase agreed to acquire Global Shares.

== History ==
Global Shares was founded in 2005. In 2020, Tim Houstoun (CEO) was announced as a finalist in the EY Entrepreneur of the year award. In the same year, the company launched a new version of its product and won the 'Company of the Year Award 2020 - IT' The company was also the winner of Technology Ireland's "Company of the Year 2021".

In 2022, JPMorgan Chase acquired Global Shares for €665 million.
