= JPMorgan GBI-EM Index =

Emerging market debt benchmarks

The JPMorgan Government Bond Index-Emerging Markets (GBI-EM) indices are comprehensive emerging market debt benchmarks that track local currency bonds issued by Emerging market governments. The index was launched in June 2005 and is the first comprehensive global local Emerging Markets index. As Emerging Market governments look increasingly toward their domestic market for sources of finance, investors are looking more closely at local markets in search for higher yield and greater diversification.

As external debt spreads compress and opportunities seem more appealing in local rates, the likely combination of increasing demand and supply will pave the way for deeper and broader local markets, which the GBI-EM will attempt to capture. The launch of the GBI-EM was followed by the Diversified versions for GBI-EM and GBI-EM BROAD in January 2006. The GBI-EM GLOBAL, launched in November 2006, is the latest addition to the GBI-EM family of indices, providing a readily investable version of the GBI-EM BROAD by excluding China and India. The GBI-EM indices are composed of only those countries from the GBI universe that meet criteria for an Emerging Market, resulting in 18 countries from four regions. The regional sub-division of the indices consists of Asia, Europe, Latin America, and Middle East/Africa.

== Index suite ==
GBI-EM Broad
GBI-EM Broad is the all-encompassing index. It includes all eligible countries regardless of capital controls and/or regulatory and tax hurdles for foreign investors. As of November 2013 the following 18 emerging market economies were part of the GBI-EM Broad index: Brazil, Chile, China, Colombia, Hungary, India, Indonesia, Malaysia, Mexico, Nigeria, Peru, Philippines, Poland, Romania, Russia, South Africa, Thailand, and Turkey.

JP Morgan announced that Nigeria will be phased out of the index over a 2-month period effective September 30, 2015. Nigeria was placed on Index Watch in January following a series of administrative measures by the Central Bank of Nigeria that impeded the ability of foreign investors to access the FX market.

GBI-EM Global
GBI-EM Global is an investable benchmark that includes only those countries that are directly accessible by most of the international investor base. The GBI-EM GLOBAL excludes countries with explicit capital controls, but does not factor in regulatory/tax hurdles in assessing eligibility. Specifically, it includes all GBI-EM countries, as well as the Brazil NTN-F, LTN, and the Colombia local TES tasa fija bond. Classified as the most investable of all three indices, the GBI-EM GLOBAL consists of China, Indonesia, Malaysia, Thailand, Czech Republic, Hungary, Poland, Romania, Turkey, Brazil, Chile, Colombia, Mexico, Peru, India, Egypt and South Africa . Although the following restriction may exist, it will not result in country exclusion: Registration of the foreign investor with the local supervisory authorities or notification of transactions is not considered a significant restriction.

GBI-EM
GBI-EM, referred to as the replicable or narrow series, is the most restrictive series. It limits inclusion to only those countries that are readily accessible and where no impediments exist for foreign investors. As of July 2022 the GBI-EM is China, Indonesia, Thailand, Malaysia, Brazil, Mexico and South Africa. This index also uses a narrower version of eligible bonds for Colombia.

== See also ==
- JPMorgan EMBI
