= Istituto Superiore Mario Boella =

Italian research institute

The Istituto Superiore Mario Boella (ISMB) was a center for applied research in the fields of telecommunication engineering and information and communication technologies located in Turin, Italy.

It was founded in 2000 by Intesa Sanpaolo SpA and the Polytechnic University of Turin. In 2019, ISMB was merged with SITI (Istituto Superiore per i Sistemi Territoriali) to create LINKS Foundation.

In 2019, the institute comprised more than 100 researchers collaborating closely with the academia, industries and the government organizations such as the European Union.
