= Sustainable employability =

Concept in research on the workplace

Sustainable employability generally refers to employees' capacities to function in work and on the labor market throughout their working lives. The topic emerged in response to population aging and the pressure that puts on retirement systems. This pressure requires the maximization of participation in paid work to be able to maintain valued retirement systems and other societally valued institutions (e.g., high quality healthcare). Consequently, research in this topic area focuses on identifying aspects of an employment situation (i.e., the work, work context, and individuals themselves, that prevent harm to individuals' ability to function at work and on the labor market. The purpose of this research is to ultimately develop interventions, in organizations that enable individuals to work in ways that are beneficial - or at least not harmful - to both themselves and the organizations they may be employed in. Much of the initial research has concentrated on older workers as this specific group was considered to need the most immediate attention. However, later work questions whether age really place such an important role in sustainable employability.

Most definitions of sustainable employability incorporate several domains of functioning at work. As workplace functioning is a multifaceted concept, aspects like employability, work ability, work engagement (sometimes referred to as 'vitality' in the context of sustainable employability) are included. However, several definitions have been forwarded in the scientific literature that differ in nuanced ways and that emphasize different aspects of functioning. Other approaches particularly propose defining sustainable employability as a form of an enduring fit between a person and their work. Such approaches show a strong connection to previous thinking on Person-Job fit and Person-Environment fit, with the extension that such a fit should be good and be sustained over time.

A commonly cited definition of sustainable employability is based on Amartya Sen's concept of capabilities. Within this capability approach to sustainable employability, individuals are considered to be sustainably employable when they have the capabilities to achieve things they value in their work and are enabled by their work to do so. Specifically, within this approach, seven capabilities that people are thought to generally value and hope to achieve via their work are a) using their knowledge and skills; b) developing their knowledge and skills; c) being involved in important decisions regarding their work; d) building meaningful relationships in work; e) setting their own goals in work; f) earning a good income via work; and g) contributing to creating something valuable in work. Importantly, this approach recognizes that work environments are crucial in facilitating people to work. However, the approach has received some criticism, as capabilities constitute both characteristics of individuals and their employment context, which complicates separating cause and effect.

Most recent approaches to sustainable employability integrate the above ideas and resolve their limitations. They do so by recognizing sustainable employability as an integrative concept that consists of several aspects of functioning, emphasizing the long term component of sustainability and the need for longitudinal research, and positioning sustainable employability as an outcome of interacting work, work contextual and individual characteristics.

As the field of sustainable employability research matures, research increasingly considers sustainable employability of specific groups of workers or segments of the labor market. Additionally, this initially Northern European topic is now increasingly studied in other parts of the world and particularly those that face similar labor market or social security systems issues.
