= Challenger bank =

Small recently created UK retail bank

Challenger banks are small, recently created retail banks that compete directly with the longer-established banks in the UK, sometimes by specialising in areas underserved by the "big four" banks (Barclays, HSBC, Lloyds Banking Group, and NatWest Group). As well as new entrants to the market, some challenger banks were created following divestment from larger banking groups (TSB Bank from Lloyds Banking Group) or wind-down of a failed large bank (Virgin Money from Northern Rock).

The banks distinguish themselves from the historic banks by modern financial technology practices, such as online-only operations, that avoid the costs and complexities of traditional banking.

== History ==
Prior to changes in the regulatory landscape in the UK financial services industry, setting up a new bank with a full UK banking licence was extremely expensive and time-consuming. This led to a very small number of banks, colloquially referred to as the "Big Four", dominating the UK market with virtually no competition at all. When Metro Bank received their license in 2010 it was the first new high street bank in a century.

In the wake of the 2008 financial crisis, the UK's government decided to open the market up to new banks. After a period of consultation, the regulation to enable this formed part of the Financial Services Act 2012, which came into force on 1 April 2013.

To guide new firms through the process of entering the banking market, the Bank of England's Prudential Regulation Authority (PRA), set up a New Bank Start-up Unit. The process begins with an expression of interest, moving to "authorisation with restrictions" if appropriate, and finally to those restrictions being lifted and the firm being granted a full banking licence.

In July 2014 the PRA, together with their co-regulators the Financial Conduct Authority, published a review of the requirements, one year on.

== List of challenger banks ==
This list contains companies that received authorisation from the PRA to operate as banks in the UK.

Bank	Established	Status	Current Accounts	Total assets (£m) (2024 - 2025 Q1)
Atom Bank	2014	App-based bank offering savings and mortgages.	No	9,032.70 (Note: As the 2024 financial statements are dated too far from 31 December 2024, the March 2025 statements are used instead to ensure fairness.)
Allica Bank	2019	Full-service challenger bank focused specifically on established small and medium enterprises (SMEs).	Business	4,934.50
Chase	2021	The fastest growing app-based bank, Chase has 2.5 million customers as of February 2025.	Yes	25,449.94
Monzo	2016	One of the early app-based banks, Monzo has 12.5 million customers as of August 2025.	Yes	18,263.85
Metro Bank	2010	The first high street bank to launch in the UK in over 150 years. In 2019 it lost £800m (40%) of its company value as the result of an accounting error in which its commercial loans were misclassified. An investigation by the PRA resulted in the bank being fined £5.38m by the PRA in December 2021. In November 2021, it entered talks with the Carlyle Group concerning a possible takeover bid.	Yes	17,582.00
N26	2016	A German app-based bank which ceased to do business in the UK in April 2020. The UK's exit from the European Union terminated the ability to "passport" a European banking licence, necessitating applying for a British banking licence to continue which N26 decided would be too complex and expensive.	Yes	
OakNorth Bank	2015	Provides business and property loans to SMEs.	Business	7,573.15
Shawbrook Bank	2011	Provides savings, business finance, property finance, personal loans.	No	8,338.50
Starling Bank	2014	Starling Bank was founded by former Allied Irish Banks COO, Anne Boden, in January 2014.	Yes	15,697.67
Tandem	2015	The former Harrods Bank, founded in 1893, which was acquired in January 2018 by fintech startup Tandem Money and renamed.	No	3,252.73
The Bank of London	2020	A universal bank. The second new principal clearing bank set up in over 250 years, it is also the first bank to attain unicorn status upon debut, after achieving a valuation of over $1.1B.		241.666 (Note: Currently only the 2023 financial statements have been publicly disclosed.)
Virgin Money	1995	A holding company that owns Clydesdale Bank plc, which in turn trades as Clydesdale Bank, Yorkshire Bank, and Virgin Money. It was originally set up by National Australia Bank (NAB) in February 2016, when it was called CYBG plc. In March 2024, the bank's parent company agreed to be acquired by Nationwide Building Society in a £2.9 billion deal that was completed on 1 October 2024 and will see the Virgin Money brand name being phased out by 2030.	Yes	89,876

== See also ==
- Banking in the United Kingdom
- List of banks in the United Kingdom
- Neobank
- Payments bank
