= Griffin (bank) =

Banking-as-a-service bank based in London, England

Griffin Bank Ltd

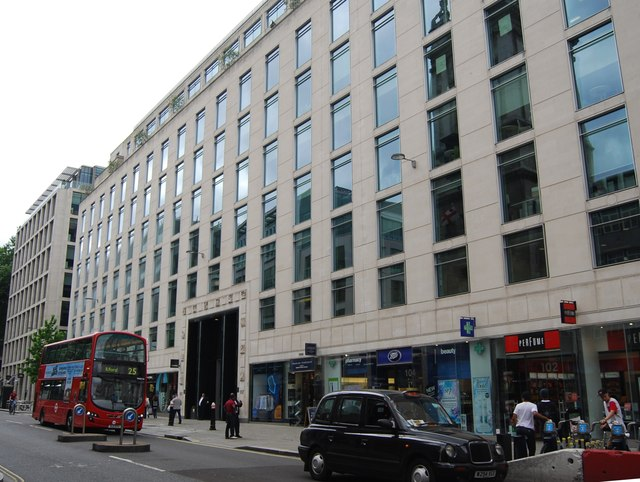
- Registered office in London, UK
- Trade name: Griffin
- Type: Private
- Industry: Banking; financial technology
- Founded: 2017
- Founders: David Jarvis; Allen Rohner
- Headquarters: London, United Kingdom
- Key people: David Jarvis (CEO); Allen Rohner (CTO)
- Products: Banking-as-a-service; business bank accounts; safeguarding accounts; client money accounts; embedded savings accounts
- Website: griffin.com

Griffin Bank Ltd, trading as Griffin, is a British bank and financial technology company headquartered in London, England. It operates an API-driven banking as a service (BaaS) platform that provides regulated bank accounts, payments and compliance infrastructure for financial technology firms and other companies that embed financial services into their products.

Griffin was founded in 2017 by software engineers David Jarvis and Allen Rohner. The company obtained a UK banking licence "with restrictions" in March 2023 and a full banking licence in March 2024 from the Prudential Regulation Authority (PRA) and Financial Conduct Authority (FCA). As of 2024, Griffin has raised around US$52 million in venture funding and has been described as the United Kingdom's first full‑stack BaaS platform with a full banking licence. In June 2024 it became a certified B Corporation.

== Business model and services ==
Griffin operates as a B2B banking‑as‑a‑service provider. Its platform offers business bank accounts for operational funds, client money and safeguarding accounts, embedded savings accounts and other types of regulated payment and deposit accounts that can be integrated into customer products via APIs. It also provides an onboarding and compliance product, Verify, which automates know‑your‑customer (KYC), know‑your‑business (KYB) and anti‑money‑laundering (AML) checks for customers using its banking services. Rather than focusing on consumer banking, Griffin's clients include fintechs and other companies in sectors such as lending, wealth management, payroll and property technology that want to embed banking features like savings or client money accounts into their own applications.

== Regulation and corporate affairs ==
Griffin Bank Ltd is registered in England and Wales as company number 10842931 and is authorised by the Prudential Regulation Authority and regulated by the Financial Conduct Authority and Prudential Regulation Authority under firm reference number 970920. Eligible deposits with the bank are protected up to £120,000 per depositor by the Financial Services Compensation Scheme (FSCS).

== See also ==
- Banking in the United Kingdom
- List of banks in the United Kingdom
- Banking as a service
