= Karen Barrett =

Irish businesswoman

- Born: September 1973 (age 53); Edgware, London, England
- Citizenship: Irish
- Education: Newcastle University (BS)
- Occupation: Businesswoman

Karen Barrett (born September 1973) is a businesswoman and the chief executive of Unbiased, a financial advice company based in the UK, which she founded in 2009.

Having worked in Mortgage Express, where she launched the company's first website, and Abbey National, Barrett founded Unbiased to provide a platform for consumers to secure free financial advice. By 2021, the firm had over 70 staff and had secured 5.6 million pounds of funding.

== Recognition ==
In 2024, Barrett was named Great British Entrepreneur of the Year and London Equity-backed Entrepreneur of the Year at the Allica Bank Great British Entrepreneur Awards. She also received the Woman of the Year Award in the fintech category at the 2024 Women in Financial Advice Awards.

== Personal life ==
From Ireland, as of 2021 Barrett was based in Hertfordshire and married with three children.
