= Banking in the United Kingdom =

Banking in the United Kingdom encompasses a system of banks and bank-like financial institutions that provide financial services to consumers and businesses, overseen by regulators and ultimately, the central bank, the Bank of England. The sector consists of incumbent major banks and innovative challenger banks. Fitch has described it as "one of the most developed and competitive [banking] markets in the world". It is undergoing rapid transformation, driven by technological advancements, evolving consumer demands, and regulatory changes.

Key players include the "Big Four" retail banks: HSBC UK, Barclays UK, Lloyds Banking Group, and NatWest, which dominate the retail and commercial banking sectors along with other major banks, which include Santander UK, Nationwide Building Society, and other institutions which play significant roles. Digital challenger banks include Revolut, Monzo, Starling Bank, and others, which offer mobile-first services to their customers.

The history of UK banking has been characterised by periods of both stability and crisis, has adapted to the changing economic landscape over centuries, and played a major role in the history of the global financial system.

== History ==
The history of banking in the United Kingdom spans centuries, with its early origins dating back to the 17th century. Following the dissolution of English monasteries, goldsmiths, with their secure storage facilities for gold and valuables, became the initial informal bankers. They issued receipts for deposited valuables and later accepted written instructions for repayment or payment to third parties, laying the foundation for modern cheques and banknotes. Thomas Smith, a cloth merchant, opened England's first provincial bank in Nottingham around 1650.

Modern banking emerged in the 18th century. The Bank of England was founded in 1694 as a private bank to manage government debt and facilitate war financing against France, it received the right to issue banknotes and lend money. The Industrial Revolution and increased international trade spurred the growth of banks, particularly in London, attracting influential merchant banking families like the Rothschilds and Barings. Banks expanded their services to include clearing facilities, security investments, and overdraft protections. The credit crisis of 1772 highlighted vulnerabilities in the burgeoning system, prompting stricter controls on banknote issuance by the Bank Charter Act 1844, giving the Bank of England a near monopoly on issuing notes.

In the 19th century, the lifting of restrictions on the number of partners of a bank allowed the formation of larger, more stable joint-stock banks, leading to the consolidation of smaller country banks. The Bank of England assumed the role of lender of last resort in times of crisis, providing liquidity to struggling banks to prevent systemic collapse. The Bank of England was nationalized by the Labour government in 1946, becoming the UK's official central bank. Banking Acts in 1979 and 1987 strengthened the regulatory framework, introducing licensing requirements for deposit-taking institutions and establishing a deposit protection fund. The Consumer Credit Act 1974 was a major reform of consumer credit and hire agreements.

The Big Bang deregulation of the London Stock Exchange in 1986 stimulated competition, leading to the demutualisation of building societies and further consolidation within the banking sector. The Bank of England was granted independence by the Labour government in 1997 providing operational independence in setting interest rates to meet the government's inflation target. The 2008 financial crisis highlighted weaknesses in the system, particularly the risky practices of some banks, leading to government interventions and rescues. The Financial Services Act 2012 transferred the responsibility for regulating and supervising banks and insurance companies back to the Bank of England, establishing the Prudential Regulation Authority (PRA) and Financial Conduct Authority (FCA).

In the 2020s, UK banks are actively embracing digital transformation, adopting technologies like AI, big data, and blockchain, and facing competition from neobanks and fintechs offering digital-first services. Nonetheless, banks are facing a number of challenges to meet consumer expectations.

Banking in the United Kingdom has played a significant role in the history of the global financial system. Its influence stems from a combination of factors, including the early development of central banking with the Bank of England, the rise of London as a global financial centre for lending and investment around the world, and the subsequent evolution of sophisticated financial markets and institutions centred on the economy of London.

== Large international banks with headquarters in the UK ==
Four large banks with international operations are headquartered in the United Kingdom: HSBC, which is the largest bank in Europe, Barclays, Standard Chartered, and Natwest Group. For regulatory purposes, the first three banks are classified as global systemically important banks (GSIBs). As well as retail and commercial banking these banks also offer various investment banking services, both within the United Kingdom and internationally. Standard Chartered does not operate retail banking within the United Kingdom.

Bank	Origins	Headquarters	Market cap ($bn)	Total assets ($bn)	Global rank by total assets	GSIB
Bank	Origins	Headquarters	As of 23 November 2024		Global rank by total assets	GSIB
HSBC	1865	London, England	183.48	3,038.80	7th	Yes
Barclays	1690	London, England	55.08	2,049.77	13th	Yes
Standard Chartered	1853	London, England				Yes
NatWest Group	1968	Edinburgh, Scotland				No

== Retail and commercial banking in the UK ==
=== Overview ===
Many banks provide retail banking to the general public and commercial banking to companies within the United Kingdom. Retail banks in the UK are commonly referred to as "high street" banks, as they traditionally maintained widespread branch networks in towns and cities across the country. However, 40% of branches closed between 2012 and 2022.

Retail and commercial banks offer a wide range of services for individuals and businesses, including:

- Current accounts: for deposits and payments;
- Payments: debit cards, credit cards, electronic payments, cheques;
- Savings accounts: for deposits with higher rates of interest, typically with incentives to hold the deposits for a longer period of time;
- Loans and mortgages: overdrafts, unsecured lending, car loans, and mortgages;
- Investments: various products for investing money;
- Insurance: policies for areas like home, life, travel, and car insurance;
- Business banking: services for small companies through to large corporates.

Services are increasingly digital and delivered online or through mobile banking apps. As a result, the number of physical bank branches has significantly decreased.

=== Big Four ===
The "Big Four" banks in the United Kingdom are commonly regarded to be HSBC, Barclays, Lloyds Banking Group, and NatWest Group, in order. This classification is primarily based on the total asset size of each banks UK-based holding company. However, when measured by domestic assets alone, Barclays is the largest UK banking group, but not the largest retail bank—because a significant proportion of its assets are tied to investment banking operations rather than retail banking.

Both HSBC and Barclays are highly globalised banking groups with a major focus on investment banking and international markets. Over 80% of Barclays total group assets are tied to its investment banking division, while nearly 70% of HSBC UK assets lie outside its ring-fenced retail subsidiary, HSBC UK Bank. As a result, their respective ring-fenced retail entities represent only a fraction of the groups total balance sheets.

Following the Financial Services (Banking Reform) Act 2013, these banking groups, as well as Santander UK, are required to legally separate their retail and commercial banking operations into ring-fenced bodies. This structural change has shifted public and regulatory focus toward the scale of retail banking entities themselves. Measured by the size of their ring-fenced banks, Lloyds Bank—part of Lloyds Banking Group—is the largest retail bank in the UK. As of 2024, Barclays Bank UK ranks fifth among UK retail banks by assets, behind even the Bank of Scotland, due to Barclays strategic emphasis on wholesale and investment banking.

This contrast highlights the differing business models of the major banks: Lloyds and NatWest have maintained a strong focus on domestic retail banking, whereas HSBC and Barclays have concentrated more on international and investment banking activities, resulting in relatively smaller UK retail operations in practice.

=== Direct banks ===
In recent years, a new category of digital-only banks—often referred to as challenger or direct banks—has gained prominence in the UK retail banking market. These include Chase UK, Monzo Bank, and Starling Bank. Operating without physical branches, they differentiate themselves through mobile-first services, streamlined onboarding, and competitive digital features.

These banks have consistently performed at the top of the UK bi‑annual customer satisfaction surveys conducted by the Competition and Markets Authority (CMA). In the survey covering July 2023 to June 2024, Monzo was ranked first and Starling Bank second for both personal and business current account satisfaction; Chase UK, a subsidiary of American bank JPMorgan Chase, made its debut and secured third place for personal current accounts. In the subsequent 2025 survey, Chase UK overtook Monzo to rank first among personal current account providers, with an 81% recommended‑by‑user score compared to Monzo 80%, and Starling third; Starling and Monzo remained the top two in the business current account rankings.

These results highlight how digital banks, despite having smaller customer bases or asset volumes compared to the traditional "Big Four," often provide superior perceived service quality and customer experience. Chase UK, in particular, attracted over 1.6 million–2.5 million customers and held deposits of approximately £15 billion by mid‑2023, demonstrating rapid growth despite its recent market entry.

=== Major retail banks ===
The following table ranks the largest UK retail banks by CET1 capital held within their ring-fenced or retail banking subsidiaries as of the first half of 2025.

Largest UK retail banks by CET1 capital (first half of 2025)
Notes: Common Equity Tier 1 (CET1) capital, as defined under the Basel III framework, represents the highest quality and most loss-absorbing form of a bank’s capital, consisting mainly of common shares and retained earnings; unlike total assets, which indicate the size of a bank’s balance sheet, CET1 reflects its core financial strength and is widely regarded as the most reliable measure of a bank’s solvency and resilience under stress.
Rank	Bank	Parent group	Headquarters	Year Est.	CET1 cap. (£m)	CET1 ratio	Total assets (£m)	Staff	Branches
1	Lloyds Bank	Lloyds Banking Group	London, England	1765	26,094	13.6%	622,557	65,435	306
2	HSBC UK Bank including first direct and M&S Bank	HSBC Holdings	Birmingham, England	2015	15,255	13.2%	341,612	20,034	327
3	National Westminster Bank trading as NatWest, including Ulster Bank	NatWest Group	London, England	1833	14,828	11.3%	435,087	55,800	342
4	Barclays Bank UK	Barclays	London, England	2015	12,372	14.5%	302,800	18,200	218
5	Bank of Scotland including Halifax	Lloyds Banking Group	Edinburgh, Scotland	1695	10,855	13.3%	338,088	20,673	304
6	Santander UK	Santander UK Group Holdings	London, England	1944	9,916	15.0%	265,600	18,000	305
7	The Royal Bank of Scotland	NatWest Group	Edinburgh, Scotland	1727	1,967	11.3%	90,476 (Note: Currently, only the 2024 annual report is publicly available.)	900	86
8	TSB Bank	Santander UK	Edinburgh, Scotland	1985	1,851	16.3%	45,472	5,047	175
9	The Co-operative Bank	Coventry Building Society	Manchester, England	1970	907	18.1%	25,480 (Note: Currently, only the 2024 annual report is publicly available.)	3,224	77

=== Non-bank retail finance providers ===
Post Office Money is a financial services brand operated by Post Office Ltd, with products provided by Bank of Ireland (UK).

== Building societies ==
The other main class of consumer financial service organisation in the United Kingdom is the building society. The building society sector has become much smaller with fewer building societies. This was caused, firstly, a number of building societies demutualising in the 1980s and 1990s and subsequently, taken over by banks. Secondly, there has been ongoing consolidation via mergers between societies.

Building societies generally offer the same core services of banks, primarily savings accounts and mortgages, and in some cases also current accounts and personal loans.

There are 42 building societies in the UK as of June 2025, which provide retail banking services to the general public. The five largest as of October 2020 are:

Name	Year Est.	Headquarters	Total Assets (£bn)	Employees	Branches
Nationwide Building Society (Note: Includes Virgin Money UK and its consolidated subsidiaries.) (also trading as Virgin Money)	1846	Swindon, England	367.9	17,680	606
Coventry Building Society	1884	Coventry, England	62	2,700	89
Yorkshire Building Society (also trading as Chelsea Building Society, Norwich and Peterborough Building Society and Accord Mortgages)	1864	Bradford, England	39.6	3,300	231
Skipton Building Society	1853	Skipton, England	17.5	1,772	98
Leeds Building Society	1875	Leeds, England	20.8	1,426	65

== National Savings and Investments ==
There is a government-run savings bank called National Savings and Investments (NS&I). It provides various low-risk savings and investment products.

== Credit unions ==
Credit unions in the UK are member-owned, not-for-profit financial cooperatives providing various services like savings, loans, and transactional banking. They operate under a "common bond," meaning members typically share a connection through their workplace, community, or organization. These institutions prioritise the financial well-being of their members and often offer more affordable options compared to traditional banks.

Credit unions offer a range of services, including savings accounts, loans (including personal, car, and home loans), current accounts, and insurance.

== Regulation ==
The Bank of England is the central bank of the United Kingdom. It oversees financial markets and financial market infrastructure like clearing houses and payment systems. The Prudential Regulation Authority (PRA) is responsible for the financial safety and soundness of banks and the banking system. The Financial Conduct Authority (FCA) regulates how banks treat clients and behave in financial markets. The Payment Systems Regulator (PSR) oversees payment systems to ensure they are developed and operated in the interests of users while promoting competition and innovation.

The economic and regulatory environment has created a number of challenges for banks.

The PRA regulates:

- 152 UK banks as of February 2025 that are authorised to accept deposits. These include banks that have their headquarters in the UK, and banks with foreign headquarters that operate in the UK through a subsidiary. The largest five have ring-fenced bodies.
- 119 non-UK banks, as of June 2025, that are incorporated outside the UK and authorised to accept deposits through a branch in the UK.
- seven banks incorporated in Gibraltar authorised to accept deposits through a branch or service in the UK.
- eight banks incorporated in the EEA authorised to accept deposits through a branch in the UK while in Supervised Run Off (SRO).
- 42 building societies, as of July 2025
- 374 credit unions, as of July 2025
- Friendly societies
- nine investment firms (i.e., broker-dealers)

== See also ==
- Banknotes of the pound sterling
- British banking law
- List of banks in the United Kingdom
- Ringfencing
- Category:Banks of dependent territories of the United Kingdom
- Category:Defunct banks of the United Kingdom
