= GiroBank =

GiroBank may refer to:

- Girobank, a former UK bank
- GiroBank, a former Danish bank (1991-1995) which through several mergers is now part of Danske Bank
