= Kroo =

Kroo or KROO may refer to:

- KROO (AM), a defunct radio station (1430 AM) formerly licensed to serve Breckenridge, Texas, United States
- Kroo (bank), a UK bank
- Kru languages
