= Vinterior =

British online marketplace

Vinterior operates as an online marketplace specializing in the sale of pre-owned antique and vintage furniture, lighting, textiles, home decor, and fine art. Starting in 2020, Vinterior transitioned into a fully remote company.

== History ==
The company was founded in 2015 by Sandrine Zhang Ferron. Initially it was launched as a marketplace consisting of a few dealers based in London, U.K. to serve the local market. In 2016, Leslie Fournier joined the company as the Chief Operating Officer. Alongside Sandrine Zhang Ferron, Chief Executive Officer, they ran the business as co-founders until Fournier’s departure in 2023.

In 2021, Vinterior collaborated with the U.K. retailer John Lewis to launch an exclusive in-store capsule collection featuring pre-owned pieces.

As of 2023, Vinterior has expanded its operations across the U.K. and Europe. Vinterior has gained recognition as a startup that is actively contributing to the advancement of the circular economy in Europe. In February 2023, Vinterior partnered with the British paint company Farrow & Ball to exhibit upcycled vintage furniture.
