= List of banks in the United Kingdom =

This list comprises banks operating in the United Kingdom that are authorised and prudentially regulated by the Prudential Regulation Authority (PRA), a part of the Bank of England. The PRA is responsible for the prudential supervision of financial firms that manage significant risks on their balance sheets, including banks, building societies, credit unions, and insurers. Its primary objective is to promote the safety and soundness of these institutions, thereby contributing to the financial stability of the UK.

The banks on this list include both UK-incorporated banks (often referred to as 'local' banks) and non-UK banks that have established a presence in the UK.

== Banks ==
=== UK banks ===
According to data from the UK Prudential Regulation Authority (PRA), as of July 2025, there are 150 locally incorporated banks in the UK, with several banking groups holding multiple banking licences.

Banks incorporated in United Kingdom
Notes: RFB: Ring-fenced bodies. The UK Financial Services (Banking Reform) Act 2013 and associated secondary legislation and regulatory rules required UK deposit-taking banks with more than £25 billion of 'core deposits' (broadly from individuals and small to medium-sized businesses) to separate their UK retail banking activities from their other wholesale and investment banking activities by 1 January 2019. The resulting UK ring fenced bank entities need to be legally distinct, operationally separate and economically independent from the non-ring-fenced bank entities. BIG4: Big Four retail banking in United Kingdom. Bank: Special status. The bank is undergoing closure or acquisition/integration. For details, please refer to the Notes.
Banking groups containing ring-fenced bodies (RFBs)
No.	Bank name	Established	SWIFT-BIC
No.	Bank name	Notes	
Barclays
1	Barclays Bank	1690	BARCGB22
1	Barclays Bank	Originally established as Barclays retail bank, it was restructured following the Financial Services (Banking Reform) Act 2013. Since the separation, Barclays Bank has focused primarily on high-risk investment banking and the Group overseas subsidiaries and branches. It is the largest component of the Group.	
2	Barclays Bank UK^{RFB BIG4}	2015	BUKBGB22
2	Barclays Bank UK^{RFB BIG4}	Barclays Bank UK is the retail banking arm of the Barclays Group in the United Kingdom. As a bank subject to the Financial Services (Banking Reform) Act 2013, it operates as a ring-fenced body and a separate legal entity.	
HSBC Holdings
3	HSBC Bank	1836	MIDLGBZ1
3	HSBC Bank	HSBC Bank traces its origins to Midland Bank, established in 1836. The HSBC Group fully acquired Midland Bank in 1992, and in 1999 it was renamed HSBC Bank as part of the Group global brand alignment strategy. Following its restructuring under the Financial Services (Banking Reform) Act 2013, it has focused primarily on high-risk investment banking and the Group overseas branches and subsidiaries. It is the largest component of the HSBC Group in the United Kingdom.	
4	HSBC Innovation Bank	2020	SVBKGB2L
4	HSBC Innovation Bank	HSBC Innovation Bank traces its origins to Silicon Valley Bank UK, established in 2020. Following the collapse of its parent company in 2023, its UK branch—including all assets—was acquired by HSBC UK Bank for £1. It was subsequently renamed HSBC Innovation Bank and continues to operate as part of the HSBC Group, providing the Group with innovation expertise and bespoke financial services.	
5	HSBC UK Bank^{RFB BIG4} including first direct and M&S Bank	2015	HBUKGB4B
5	HSBC UK Bank^{RFB BIG4} including first direct and M&S Bank	HSBC UK Bank is the retail banking arm of the HSBC Group in the UK, operating as a separate, ring-fenced legal entity. The bank directly operates first direct as a sub-brand, as well as M&S Bank, following the full integration of Marks & Spencer Financial Services into HSBC UK in June 2026. Following a strategic consolidation of the group legal structures, HSBC UK Bank now fully encompasses the operations of HSBC Private Bank (UK). This integration process began with a majority transfer of operations on 1 January 2020 and concluded when HSBC Private Bank (UK)—whose origins trace back to the 1853 establishment of Samuel Montagu & Co.—successfully completed its full migration and officially withdrew its banking licence on 17 February 2026.	
Lloyds Banking Group
6	Lloyds Bank^{RFB BIG4}	1765	LOYDGB2L
6	Lloyds Bank^{RFB BIG4}	Lloyds Bank is the retail banking arm of the Lloyds Banking Group in the United Kingdom. As a bank subject to the Financial Services (Banking Reform) Act 2013, it operates as a ring-fenced body and a separate legal entity.	
7	Bank of Scotland^{RFB} including Halifax	1695	BOFSGBZ1
7	Bank of Scotland^{RFB} including Halifax	Bank of Scotland is the oldest member of Lloyds Banking Group, established by the Parliament of Scotland in 1695. In September 2008, amid the global financial crisis and facilitated by the UK government, it became a member of Lloyds Banking Group following Lloyds full acquisition of its parent holding company, HBOS plc. It remains one of the four major banks in Scotland today. The bank also operates the Halifax division, which functions as a sub-brand of the bank.	
8	Lloyds Bank Corporate Markets	2016	LLCMGB22
8	Lloyds Bank Corporate Markets	Lloyds Bank Corporate Markets is the non-ring-fenced entity of Lloyds Banking Group established under the Financial Services (Banking Reform) Act 2013. It primarily handles high-risk investment banking and the Group overseas branches and subsidiaries. Since Lloyds operates as a retail banking-focused group, this entity is considerably smaller in scale compared to its retail banking counterpart within the same Group.	
NatWest Group
9	National Westminster Bank^{RFB BIG4} trading as NatWest, including Ulster Bank	1833	NWBKGB2L
9	National Westminster Bank^{RFB BIG4} trading as NatWest, including Ulster Bank	NatWest is the retail banking arm of the NatWest Group in the United Kingdom. As a bank subject to the Financial Services (Banking Reform) Act 2013, it operates as a ring-fenced body and a separate legal entity. It was subject to a hostile takeover by the Royal Bank of Scotland Group in March 2000 and, during the Group restructuring in 2020, its name was adopted as the Group new legal name. The bank also operates the Ulster Bank division, which functions as a sub-brand of the bank.	
10	The Royal Bank of Scotland^{RFB}	1727	RBOSGB2L
10	The Royal Bank of Scotland^{RFB}	The Royal Bank of Scotland traces its origins back to 1727. However, due to the complexities arising from the 2008 financial crisis and Financial Services (Banking Reform) Act 2013, the original Royal Bank of Scotland entity was renamed NatWest Markets in 2018 after divesting its retail, commercial, and corporate banking operations to Adam and Company—a private bank and wealth management firm acquired by the Royal Bank of Scotland Group in 1993. The current legal entity operating as the Royal Bank of Scotland is the result of Adam and Company being renamed in the same year. It is one of the "Big Four" banks in Scotland.	
11	Coutts & Company^{RFB} trading as Coutts	1692	COUTGB31
11	Coutts & Company^{RFB} trading as Coutts	Coutts is the oldest member of the NatWest Group, with a history dating back to 1692. It is a renowned UK private bank and wealth management firm, famous for serving the British royal family and aristocracy. In 1920, Coutts merged with the National Provincial & Union Bank of England but retained the Coutts brand. Subsequently, in 1969, it became part of NatWest following the merger of National Provincial Bank and Westminster Bank to form National Westminster Bank. In 2000, NatWest was acquired by the Royal Bank of Scotland Group, and Coutts became part of today NatWest Group. In 2022, after Adam and Company had fulfilled its role within the NatWest Group and was renamed Royal Bank of Scotland, its remaining private banking and lending operations were transferred and integrated into Coutts.	
12	NatWest Markets	2018	RBOSGB2R
12	NatWest Markets	NatWest Markets is an independent non-ring-fenced legal entity operating under the Financial Services (Banking Reform) Act 2013. It was established in 2018 following the separation of retail, commercial, and corporate banking operations from the original Royal Bank of Scotland, in compliance with the 2013 legislation. The remaining investment banking operations, along with NatWest Bank interest rate and foreign exchange over-the-counter derivatives business, were consolidated and restructured to form NatWest Markets. It remains the original legal entity of the former Royal Bank of Scotland.	
Santander UK Group Holdings
13	Santander UK^{RFB} including cahoot	1944	ABBYGB2L
13	Santander UK^{RFB} including cahoot	Santander UK is the retail banking arm of the Santander UK Group in the United Kingdom. As a bank subject to the Financial Services (Banking Reform) Act 2013, it operates as a ring-fenced body and a separate legal entity. Santander UK traces its origins to Abbey National, founded in 1944. It was acquired by Spanish Banco Santander, S.A. in 2004 and was renamed Santander UK in 2010 following its merger with Bradford & Bingley. The name Santander UK did not arise from requirements under the Financial Services (Banking Reform) Act 2013, but rather reflects its role as the UK arm of the Spanish Santander Group. The 2013 act had minimal impact on Santander UK, as the bank operations were already almost entirely focused on retail banking. However, a small portion of high-risk investment and overseas subsidiary activities still needed to be transferred to Santander Financial Services.	
14	Cater Allen^{RFB}	1816	CATEGB21
14	Cater Allen^{RFB}	Cater Allen traces its origins back to 1816 and is primarily engaged in private banking. It was acquired by Abbey National in 1997, and subsequently became part of today Santander UK Group following Abbey National acquisition by Santander in 2004.	
15	Santander Financial Services	1989	ANFPGB21EQD
15	Santander Financial Services	Santander Financial Services is the non-ring-fenced entity of Santander UK Group operating under the Financial Services (Banking Reform) Act 2013. However, it was not established under that legislation; it was renamed from Abbey National Treasury Services in 2019. Today, it is responsible for managing high-risk investment banking and the Group overseas subsidiaries and branches.	
16	TSB Bank	1985	TSBSGB2A
16	TSB Bank	Acquired by Santander UK in April 2026, with plans to integrate the business with its own in the first half of 2027.	
Other banking groups
No.	Bank name	Established	SWIFT-BIC
No.	Bank name	Notes	
17	ABC International Bank	1990	ABCEGB2L
18	AIB Group (UK)	1985	AIBKGB2L
19	Al Rayan Bank	2002	ARAYGB22
20	Alpha Bank London	1922	ALBLGB2L
21	Arbuthnot Latham & Co	1964	ARBUGB2L
22	Bank Mandiri (Europe)	1999	BMRIGB2L
23	Bank of Africa United Kingdom	2007	MEDTGB2L
24	Bank Of Baroda (UK)	2017	BARBGB22
25	Bank of Beirut (UK)	2002	BRBAGB2L
26	Bank of Ceylon (UK)	2008	BCEYGB2L
27	Bank of China (UK)	2007	BKCHGB2U
28	Bank of Ireland (UK)	2009	BOFIGB2B
29	Bank of London and The Middle East	2006	BLMEGB2L
30	Bank of the Philippine Islands	2006	BOPIGB2L
31	Bank Saderat	1973	SADRGB21
32	Bank Sepah International	2001	SEPBGB31
33	Birmingham Bank	1955	BIRBGB2L
34	British Arab Commercial Bank	1972	BACMGB2L
35	Brown Shipley & Co	1945	BSCOGB2L
36	C. Hoare & Co	1672	HOABGB2L
37	CAF Bank	1984	CAFBGB21
38	Cambridge & Counties Bank	2012	POYRGB21
39	Citibank UK	2018	CIUKGB2L
40	Close Brothers	1924	CBRLGB2L
41	Clydesdale Bank plc	1838	CLYDGB2S
41	Clydesdale Bank plc	Clydesdale Bank, established in 1838 and one of Scotland four major banks and three note-issuing institutions, was acquired by Midland Bank in 1920, became part of National Australia Bank from 1987 to 2016, was spun off to form CYBG with Yorkshire Bank in 2016, later absorbed Virgin Money in 2018 and rebranded the group as Virgin Money UK in 2019—consolidating all banking assets under Clydesdale licence while retaining the Clydesdale brand for Scottish banknote issuance—and was acquired by Nationwide Building Society on 1 October 2024, with full integration planned by 2030 while continuing to operate as a separate legal entity in the interim.	
42	Credit Suisse (UK)	1986	CSUKGB2L
43	Credit Suisse International	1990	CSFPGB2L
44	Crown Agents Bank	1989	CRASGB2L
45	DB UK Bank	1936	MGCOGB2L
46	EFG Private Bank	1988	EFGBGB2L
47	Europe Arab Bank	2005	ARABGB2L
48	FCE Bank	1963	FEEFGB21
49	FCMB Bank (UK)	2008	FCMBGB22
50	FidBank UK	2003	UBNIGB2L
51	FirstBank UK	2002	FBNIGB2L
52	Ghana International Bank	1997	GHIBGB2L
53	Guaranty Trust Bank (UK)	2006	GTBIGB2L
54	Gulf International Bank (UK)	1975	SINTGB2L
55	Habib Bank Zurich	1973	HBZUGB2L
56	Hampden & Co	2010	HAMPGB22
57	Hampshire Trust Bank	1977	HTPLGB21
58	Handelsbanken	2018	HANDGB22
59	Havin Bank	1972	HAVIGB2L
60	HBL BANK UK	1983	HABBGB2L
61	ICBC (London)	2002	ICBKGB2L
62	ICBC Standard Bank	1987	SBLLGB2L
63	ICICI Bank UK	2003	ICICGB2L
64	Investec Bank	1950	IVESGB2L
65	Itau BBA International	2010	ITAUGB2L
66	J.P. Morgan Securities	1930	JPMSGB2L
67	Jordan International Bank	1984	JIBKGB2L
68	Julian Hodge Bank	1962	JHBAGB21
69	Kexim Bank UK	1992	KEXBGB2L
70	Kingdom Bank	2002	KNGDGB22
71	Kuwait Finance House	1966	UBKLGB2L
72	Melli Bank	2001	MELIGB21
73	Methodist Chapel Aid	1890	-
74	Metro Bank	2007	MYMBGB2L
75	Mizuho International	1975	IBJIGB2L
76	Morgan Stanley Bank International	1999	MSDWGB2L
77	National Bank of Egypt (UK)	1992	NBEGGB2L
78	National Bank of Kuwait (International)	1992	NBOKGB2L
79	Nomura Bank International	1986	NOMAGBKA
80	Northern Bank trading as Danske Bank	1883	DABAGB2B
81	Charter Court Financial Services	2008	CCFSGB22
82	OneSavings Bank	2010	KENTGB22
83	Oxbury Bank	2018	OXBRGB22
84	Persia International Bank	2001	PIBPGB21
85	Philippine National Bank (Europe)	1994	PNBMGB2L
86	Punjab National Bank (International)	2006	PUNBGB22
87	QIB (UK)	2003	EFHLGB2L
88	Rathbones Investment Management	1979	RATHGB2L
89	RBC Europe	1970	ROYCGB22
90	Reliance Bank	1900	RELAGB22
91	Schroder & Co	1988	SCPBGB2L
92	Secure Trust Bank	1954	STBZGB2S
93	Shawbrook Bank	1944	WWLLGB21
94	SMBC Bank International	2003	SMBCGB2L
95	Standard Chartered Bank	1853	SCBLGBKD
95	Standard Chartered Bank	Standard Chartered Bank, together with its parent company Standard Chartered, is one of the United Kingdom global systemically important banking groups (G-SIBs), tracing its origins to a royal charter granted by Queen Victoria in England in 1853—which inspired the term "Chartered" in its name—and while it does not operate retail banking in the UK, its core businesses focus on multinational corporations banking, transaction banking, and private banking, with retail operations overseas including a 13.6% stake in Standard Chartered Bank Singapore (the Group second-largest profit contributor by region, jointly owned in full with the parent company), excluding the Group largest component, Standard Chartered Hong Kong, which is directly held by the parent.	
96	State Bank of India (UK)	2016	SBOIGB2L
97	TD Bank Europe	1992	EUOPGB21
98	The Access Bank UK	2007	ABNGGB2L
99	The Bank of New York Mellon	1996	SGWLGBKD
100	The Charity Bank	2002	CHYRGB22
101	The Co-operative Bank	1970	CPBKGB22
101	The Co-operative Bank	On 1 January 2025, The Co-operative Bank was acquired by Coventry Building Society, which plans to gradually integrate the bank over several years, during which the bank will continue to operate under its existing name and banking licence.	
102	Triodos Bank UK	2018	TRIOGB22
103	TURKISH BANK (UK)	1991	TUBAGB2L
104	Union Bancaire Privée (UK)	1969	UBPGGB2X
105	Union Bank of India (UK)	2011	UBINGB2L
106	United Bank for Africa (UK)	1995	UBACGB2L
107	United National Bank	2001	NBPAGB2L
108	United Trust Bank	1955	UTDBGB2L
109	Unity Trust Bank	1984	UYTBGB21
110	VTB Capital	1919	MNBLGB2L
110	VTB Capital	Insolvency proceedings were initiated in 2022.	
111	Weatherbys Bank	1770	WBYSGB22
112	Zenith Bank (UK)	2006	ZEIBGB2L
Direct bank
No.	Bank name	Established	SWIFT-BIC
No.	Bank name	Notes	
113	Afin Bank	2020	AFIMGB21
114	Aldermore Bank	1969	ALDBGB2P
115	Allica Bank	2011	CIIVGB22
116	Atom Bank	2013	ATMBGB22
117	Castle Trust Capital	2010	CSRAGB22
118	Chetwood Financial	2016	CHFIGB22
119	ClearBank	2015	CLRBGB22
119	ClearBank	ClearBank also partners with Chip to provide deposit services for its users.	
120	Cynergy Bank	2003	BCYPGB2L
121	DF Capital Bank	2016	CTTLGB22
122	Gatehouse Bank	2007	GHOUGB2L
123	GB Bank	2017	GBBLGB22
124	Griffin	2017	GFNBGB22
125	iFAST Global Bank	2003	EZYRGB2L
126	J.P. Morgan Europe trading as Chase	1968	CHASGB22
126	J.P. Morgan Europe trading as Chase	J.P. Morgan Europe launched its direct banking service in the UK in September 2021 under the brand name Chase. This marked the first time that JPMorgan Chase introduced its retail banking business outside the United States.	
127	JN Bank UK	2018	JANAGB22
128	Kroo Bank	2016	KROOGB22
129	LHV BANK	2021	LHVBGB2L
130	Monument Bank	2017	MNMTGB22
131	Monzo Bank	2015	MONZGB2L
132	Goldman Sachs International Bank trading as Marcus by Goldman Sachs^{®}	1973	GOSNGB2L
133	OakNorth Bank	2015	OAKNGB22
134	Paragon Bank	1989	PRGNGB22
135	Perenna Bank	2020	PBUKGB22
136	RCI Bank UK	2018	RCINGB23
137	Recognise Bank	2017	RGBKGB2L
138	Redwood Bank	2015	REDWGB22
139	Revolut Bank U.K. Ltd	2020	REVOGB2L
139	Revolut Bank U.K. Ltd	Revolut Bank U.K. Ltd is the UK banking entity of Revolut Group Holdings Ltd. It is supervised by both the Prudential Regulation Authority (PRA) and the Financial Conduct Authority (FCA). It received authorization from the PRA in July 2024 and was approved to operate as a fully licensed bank in March 2026. The licence enables Revolut to offer insured deposit accounts, current accounts and consumer lending products, including loans and overdrafts with eligible deposits protected under the Financial Services Compensation Scheme (FSCS) up to £120,000 per person.	
140	Starling Bank	2014	SRLGGB2L
141	StreamBank	2019	STMBGB22
142	Tandem Bank	2014	HLBAGB2L
143	The Bank of London Group	2020	TBOLGB2L
144	Vanquis Bank	1990	VQISGB2L
145	Vida Bank	2015	BEGFGB22
146	Zempler Bank	2003	APSFGB2L
147	Zopa Bank	2005	ZOFSGB2L

==== Total assets ====
This table ranks banking entities registered in the United Kingdom based on their consolidated total assets as of the latest available financial data from 2024 through Q1 2025. The rankings are based solely on the size of UK-registered bank entities and may include the asset contributions of overseas branches that form part of the same UK-registered legal entity.

Regulated UK-banks ranked by consolidated total assets (2024 - 2025 Q1)
Notes: ‡: The registered banking entity holds multiple domestic and international legal entities with substantial assets. Accordingly, its financial statements reflect the full consolidation of controlled subsidiaries—typically defined as those where the bank holds more than 50% of voting rights—in compliance with International Financial Reporting Standard 10 (IFRS 10): Consolidated Financial Statements. §: The reported figures are based on combined estimates for the local bank under the same holding group; these data are intended for indicative comparison purposes only.
Rank	Bank name	Total assets (£m)
1	Barclays^{§}	1,518,202
	Barclays Bank^{‡}	1,218,524
	Barclays Bank UK	303,179
2	HSBC^{§}	1,149,709
	HSBC Bank^{‡}	769,828
	HSBC UK Bank^{‡}	369,272
	HSBC Innovation Bank	10,609
3	Lloyds^{§}	906,697
	Lloyds Bank	611,213
	Bank of Scotland	331,084
	Lloyds Bank Corporate Markets^{‡}	94,972
4	NatWest^{§}	707,985
	National Westminster Bank	424,309
	The Royal Bank of Scotland	90,476
	Coutts & Company	62,860
	NatWest Markets^{‡}	183,166
5	J.P. Morgan^{§}	582,453
	J.P. Morgan Europe^{‡}	25,449.94
	J.P. Morgan Securities^{‡}	US$697,596m (~£557,003.09m)
6	Morgan Stanley Bank International^{‡}	US$640,936m (~£511,804.10m)
7	Standard Chartered Bank^{‡}	US$564,534m (~£451,281.16m)
8	Santander^{§}	267,076
	Santander UK	259,944
	Cater Allen	5,580.55
	Santander Financial Services^{‡}	7,087
9	Nomura Bank International^{‡}	US$223,159m (Note: Currently only the financial statements for March 2024 have been publicly disclosed.) (~£178,264.45m)
10	Clydesdale Bank	89,876 (Note: As the 2024 financial statements are dated too far from 31 December 2024, the March 2025 statements are used instead to ensure fairness.)
11	Goldman Sachs International Bank^{‡}	US$89,783m (~£71,693.11m)
12	RBC Europe^{‡}	52,030 (Note: Currently only the financial statements for October 2024 have been publicly disclosed.)
13	TSB Bank	46,099.10
14	Credit Suisse International^{‡}	US$51,374m (~£41,037.63m)
15	SMBC Bank International^{‡}	US$50,064m (Note: Currently only the financial statements for March 2024 have been publicly disclosed.) (~£39,974.69m)
16	Handelsbanken^{‡}	30,713.86
17	OSB^{§}	30,244
	Charter Court Financial Services	12,797.50
	OneSavings Bank	17,829.50
18	Investec Bank^{‡}	29,734.09 (Note: As the 2024 financial statements are dated too far from 31 December 2024, the March 2025 statements are used instead to ensure fairness.)
19	The Co-operative Bank	25,479.70
20	Mizuho International^{‡}	24,933.90
21	Sainsbury's Bank	24,648.00 (Note: As the 2024 financial statements are dated too far from 31 December 2024, the March 2025 statements are used instead to ensure fairness.)
22	ICBC Standard Bank^{‡}	US$26,600m (~£21,250.25m)
23	Schroder & Co	20,949.90
24	Aldermore Bank	20,540.00
25	Paragon Bank	19,270.00
26	Bank of Ireland (UK)	18,611.00
27	Monzo Bank	18,263.85
28	Metro Bank	17,582.00
29	Starling Bank	15,697.67 (Note: As the 2024 financial statements are dated too far from 31 December 2024, the March 2025 statements are used instead to ensure fairness.)
30	Close Brothers	14,438.20 (Note: Currently only the financial statements for January 2025 have been publicly disclosed.)
31	Northern Bank	13,967.37 (Note: Currently only the 2023 financial statements have been publicly disclosed.)
32	FCE Bank	13,837.00
33	TD Bank Europe^{‡}	CA$23,702m (Note: Currently only the financial statements for October 2024 have been publicly disclosed.) (~£13,166.71m)
34	Gulf International Bank (UK)^{‡}	US$14,499m (~£11,584.01m)
35	ClearBank	11,064.06
36	Brown Shipley & Co^{‡}	€11,853m (~£9,828.88m)
37	AIB Group (UK)^{‡}	9,820.00
38	Itau BBA International^{‡}	US$11,909m (~£9,515.26m)
39	Atom Bank	9,032.70 (Note: As the 2024 financial statements are dated too far from 31 December 2024, the March 2025 statements are used instead to ensure fairness.)
40	Shawbrook Bank	8,338.50
41	The Bank of New York Mellon (International)^{‡}	8,077.77
42	OakNorth Bank	7,573.15
43	RCI Bank UK	6,932.00 (Note: Currently only the financial statements for October 2024 have been publicly disclosed.)
44	C. HOARE & CO	6,801.46
45	EFG Private Bank	6,609.00
46	Zopa Bank	6,229.05
47	Hampshire Trust Bank	5,814.63
48	Cynergy Bank	5,098.50
49	ALLICA BANK	4,934.50
50	The Access Bank UK	US$6,124m (~£4,893.17m)
51	Arbuthnot Latham & Co	4,729.23
52	Union Bancaire Privée (UK)	4,530.10 (Note: Currently only the 2023 financial statements have been publicly disclosed.)
53	Secure Trust Bank	4,116.70
54	National Bank of Kuwait (International)^{‡}	3,934.57
55	United Trust Bank	3,913.26
56	ABC International Bank^{‡}	3,487.00
57	Vanquis Bank	3,375.30
58	British Arab Commercial Bank^{‡}	3,343.47
59	Tandem Bank	3,252.73
60	DB UK Bank	3,139.05
61	Chetwood Financial	3,077.90 (Note: Currently only the financial statements for March 2024 have been publicly disclosed.)
62	Rathbones Investment Management^{‡}	3,017.73
63	Al Rayan Bank^{‡}	2,835.72
64	FirstBank UK	US$3,174m (~£2,536.88m)
65	Oxbury Bank	2,531.97
66	Bank of China (UK)	2,323.32
67	Vida Bank	2,283.37
68	KUWAIT FINANCE HOUSE	US$2,740m (~£2,189.42m)
69	Zenith Bank (UK)	US$2,649m (~£2,166.85m)
70	Europe Arab Bank^{‡}	€2,490m (~£2,064m)
71	Julian Hodge Bank	2,008.80 (Note: Currently only the financial statements for September 2024 have been publicly disclosed.)
72	Triodos Bank UK	1,946.33
73	Weatherbys Bank	1,848.49
74	State Bank Of India (UK)	1,843.00 (Note: Currently only the financial statements for March 2024 have been publicly disclosed.)
75	Crown Agents Bank	1,818.01
76	Credit Suisse (UK)^{‡}	1,797.17
77	ICICI Bank UK^{‡}	US$2,203m (Note: Currently only the financial statements for March 2024 have been publicly disclosed.) (~£1,759.41m)
78	Unity Trust Bank	1,711.66
79	Cambridge & Counties Bank	1,581.74
80	Bank of London and The Middle East	1,540.00
81	CAF Bank	1,510.93 (Note: Currently only the financial statements for April 2024 have been publicly disclosed.)
82	Gatehouse Bank	1,442.15
83	National Bank of Egypt (UK)	1,378.95
84	ICBC (London)	US$1,702m (~£1,359.3m)
85	Habib Bank Zurich	1,284.40
86	GB Bank	1,157.74 (Note: Currently only the financial statements for September 2024 have been publicly disclosed.)
87	QIB (UK)	1,125.45
88	Castle Trust Capital	1,102.13 (Note: Currently only the financial statements for September 2024 have been publicly disclosed.)
89	Ghana International Bank^{‡}	1,095.69
90	HAMPDEN & CO	1,089.30
91	Monument Bank	1,047.79 (Note: Currently only the 2023 financial statements have been publicly disclosed.)
92	United National Bank	919.934 (Note: Currently only the 2023 financial statements have been publicly disclosed.)
93	Kroo Bank	873.918 (Note: Currently only the 2023 financial statements have been publicly disclosed.)
94	Punjab National Bank (International)^{‡}	US$1,087m (Note: Currently only the financial statements for March 2024 have been publicly disclosed.) (~£868.851m)
95	DF Capital Bank	786.54
96	IFAST GLOBAL BANK	700.615
97	Citibank UK	684.629
98	LHV BANK	662.432
99	REDWOOD BANK	635.401
100	Zempler Bank	617.973 (Note: Currently only the financial statements for March 2024 have been publicly disclosed.)
101	KEXIM BANK (UK)	586.008
102	Guaranty Trust Bank (UK)	583.446
103	HBL BANK UK	564.1
104	Alpha Bank London	485.136
105	Jordan International Bank^{‡}	484.97
106	Bank of Beirut (UK)	482.771
107	RECOGNISE BANK	470.531 (Note: Currently only the financial statements for March 2024 have been publicly disclosed.)
108	FCMB Bank (UK)	461
109	The Charity Bank	445.667
110	UNION BANK OF INDIA (UK)	US$481m (Note: As the 2024 financial statements are dated too far from 31 December 2024, the March 2025 statements are used instead to ensure fairness.) (~£384m)
111	United Bank for Africa (UK)	US$470m (~£375.128m)
112	JN Bank UK	349.374 (Note: Currently only the financial statements for March 2024 have been publicly disclosed.)
113	Melli Bank	€376m (~£311.616m)
114	RELIANCE BANK	276.893 (Note: Currently only the financial statements for March 2024 have been publicly disclosed.)
115	Bank of Africa United Kingdom	271.949 (Note: Currently only the 2023 financial statements have been publicly disclosed.)
116	Bank Sepah International^{‡}	€315m (Note: As the 2024 financial statements are dated too far from 31 December 2024, the March 2025 statements are used instead to ensure fairness.) (~£261.331m)
117	The Bank of London Group	241.666 (Note: Currently only the 2023 financial statements have been publicly disclosed.)
118	Bank of the Philippine Islands (Europe)^{‡}	228.864
119	FidBank UK	US$272m (~£217.356m)
120	Bank Of Baroda (UK)	214.105 (Note: Currently only the financial statements for March 2024 have been publicly disclosed.)
121	Bank Mandiri (Europe)^{‡}	US$262m (~£209.285m)
122	Bank Saderat	€227m (~£188.402m)
123	StreamBank	185.251 (Note: Currently only the financial statements for March 2024 have been publicly disclosed.)
124	TURKISH BANK (UK)	182.362
125	BANK OF CEYLON (UK)	172.68
126	BIRMINGHAM BANK	151.081
127	Persia International Bank^{‡}	€178m (~£147.81m)
128	Kingdom Bank	138.492
129	Havin Bank	121.958 (Note: Currently only the 2023 financial statements have been publicly disclosed.)
130	Perenna Bank	55.515
131	Methodist Chapel Aid	36.147
132	Revolut NewCo UK	21.805
133	Griffin Bank	18.726 (Note: Currently only the financial statements for September 2024 have been publicly disclosed.)
134	Philippine National Bank (Europe)^{‡}	€15m (~£12.409m)
135	Afin Bank	3.358 (Note: Currently only the 2023 financial statements have been publicly disclosed.)

=== Non-UK banks ===
According to data from the UK Prudential Regulation Authority (PRA), as of July 2025, there are 135 non-UK incorporated banks operating in the UK through branch structures, including 7 banks from Gibraltar and 8 banks incorporated from EEA, with several banking groups also holding locally incorporated banking licences in the UK.

Banks incorporated outside the UK
No.	Headquarters	Bank name	Established	SWIFT-BIC	Notes
1	Netherlands	ABN AMRO Bank NV	2010	FTSBGB2L	
2	Netherlands	Adyen N.V.	2023	ADYBGB22	
3	China	Agricultural Bank of China	2017	ABOCGB3L	
4	Spain	Allfunds Bank S.A.U	2006	ALLFGB2L	
5	Ireland	Allied Irish Banks	1993	AIBKGB2L	
6	Bahrain	Arab Banking Corporation (B.S.C)	2007	ABCEGB2L	
7	Saudi Arabia	Arab National Bank	1986	ARNBGB2L	
8	Australia	Australia and New Zealand Banking Group	1993	ANZBGB2L	
9	Spain	Banco Bilbao Vizcaya Argentaria SA	1988	BBVAGB2L	
10	Spain	Banco de Sabadell	1993	BSABGB2L	
11	Brazil	Banco do Brasil SA	1971	BRASGB2L	
12	Spain	Banco Santander, S.A.	1955	BSCHGB2L	
13	Thailand	Bangkok Bank Public Company	1957	BKKBGB2L	
14	United States	Bank of America, N.A.	1931	BOFAGB2U	
15	India	Bank of Baroda	1946	BARBGB2L	
16	China	Bank of China	1929	BKCHGB2L	Bank of China has also established a subsidiary entity in the United Kingdom as a locally incorporated bank.
17	China	Bank of Communications Co	1993	COMMGB3L	
18	India	Bank of India	1946	BKIDGB2L	
19	Canada	Bank of Montreal	1993	BOFMGB2X	
20	Taiwan	Bank of Taiwan	2004	BKTWGB2L	
21	Germany	Bank Pictet & Cie (Europe) AG	2014	PICTGB5L	
22	Luxembourg	Banking Circle S.A.	2019	SAPYGB2L	
23	France	Banque Banorient France	1983	BLOMGB2L	
24	Malta	BNF Bank	2019	-	
25	France	BNP Paribas	1986	BNPAGB22	
26	France	CACEIS Bank	2016	ISAEGB2L	
27	Spain	Caixabank SA	2023	CAIXGB2L	
28	Canada	Canadian Imperial Bank of Commerce	1993	CIBCGB2L	
29	India	Canara Bank	1983	CNRBGB2L	
30	Taiwan	Chang Hwa Commercial Bank	1993	CCBCGB2L	
31	Japan	Chiba Bank	1991	CHBAGB2L	
32	China	China Citic Bank Corporation	-	CIBKGB2L	
33	China	China Construction Bank Corporation	2014	PCBCGB2B	
34	China	China Merchants Bank	2009	CMBCGB2L	
35	China	China Minsheng Banking Corporation	-	MSBCGB2L	
36	Malaysia	CIMB Bank Berhad	1999	CIBBGB2L	
37	United States	Citibank Europe	2015	CITTGB2L	
38	United States	Citibank, N.A.	1920	CITIGB2L	
39	Germany	Commerzbank AG	1973	COBAGB2I	
40	Australia	Commonwealth Bank of Australia	1993	CTBAGB2L	
41	Isle of Man	Conister Bank	2021	-	
42	Netherlands	Cooperatieve Rabobank U.A.	1985	RABOGB2L	
43	France	Credit Agricole Corporate and Investment Bank	1921	CRLYGB2L	
44	France	Credit Agricole S.A.	1984	AGRIGB2L	
45	France	Credit Industriel et Commercial	1993	CMCIGB2L	
46	Denmark	Danske Bank A/S	1993	DABAGB2L	
47	Singapore	DBS Bank	1993	DBSSGB2L	
48	Germany	Deutsche Bank AG	1993	DEUTGB2L	
49	Norway	DNB Bank ASA	2004	DNBAGB2L	
50	Germany	DZ Bank AG, Deutsche Zentral-Genossenschaftsbank	1993	GENOGB2L	
51	United Arab Emirates	Emirates NBD Bank (P.J.S.C)	2010	EBILGB2L	
52	Luxembourg	Eurobank Private Bank Luxembourg S.A.	2015	ERBKGB2L	
53	United Arab Emirates	First Abu Dhabi Bank P.J.S.C.	1993	NBADGB2L	
54	Taiwan	First Commercial Bank	1984	FCBKGB2L	
55	South Africa	FirstRand Bank	2008	FIRNGB2L	
56	United States	Goldman Sachs Bank USA	2012	GSLDGB2L	
57	Bahrain	Gulf International Bank Bsc	-	GULFGB2L	
58	Switzerland	Habib Bank AG Zurich	1974	HBZUGB2L	
59	Taiwan	Hua Nan Commercial Bank	1998	HNBKGB2L	
60	Sweden	Ikano Bank AB (publ)	2004	-	
61	China	Industrial and Commercial Bank of China	2011	ICBKGB3L	
62	South Korea	Industrial Bank of Korea	2023	IBKOGB2L	
63	Netherlands	ING Bank N.V.	1981	INGBGB2L	
64	Italy	Intesa Sanpaolo SpA	1993	BCITGB2L	
65	United States	J.P. Morgan SE	2018	JPMGGB2L	
66	United States	JPMorgan Chase Bank, National Association	1993	CHASGBKP	
67	Belgium	KBC Bank NV	2023	KREDGB2X	
68	South Korea	KEB Hana Bank	1993	KOEXGB2L	
69	South Korea	Kookmin Bank Co	2018	CZNBGB2L	
70	Germany	Landesbank Baden-Wurttemberg	1978	SOLAGB2L	
71	Luxembourg	Lombard Odier (Europe) S.A.	2013	LOCYGB2L	
72	Australia	Macquarie Bank	1994	MACQGB2L	
73	Malaysia	Malayan Banking Berhad	1962	MBBEGB2L	
74	United Arab Emirates	Mashreqbank psc	1978	MSHQGB2L	
75	Taiwan	Mega International Commercial Bank Co.	-	ICBCGB2L	
76	Japan	Mitsubishi UFJ Trust and Banking Corporation	1976	MTBCGB2L	
77	Israel	Mizrahi Tefahot Bank	1983	MIZBGB2L	
78	Japan	Mizuho Bank	1952	MHCBGB2L	
79	Japan	MUFG BANK	1956	BOTKGB2L	
80	Australia	National Australia Bank	1993	NATAGB2L	
81	Canada	National Bank of Canada	1993	BNDCGB2L	
82	France	Natixis	-	NATXGB2L	
83	South Africa	Nedbank	1906	NEDSGB2L	
84	Isle of Man	Nedbank Private Wealth	2008	FBLNGB2L	
85	South Korea	NongHyup Bank	2021	-	
86	Finland	Nordea Bank Abp	2018	NDEAGB2L	
87	Luxembourg	Northern Trust Global Services SE	-	CNORGB2X	
88	Singapore	Oversea-Chinese Banking Corporation	1993	OCBCGB2L	
89	Indonesia	PT Bank Negara Indonesia (Persero) Tbk	1985	BNINGB2L	
90	Qatar	Qatar National Bank (Q.P.S.C.)	1977	QNBAGB2L	
91	Canada	RBC Investor Services Trust	2005	RTBSGB2L	
92	Saudi Arabia	Riyad Bank	1983	RIBLGB2L	
93	Canada	Royal Bank of Canada	1910	ROYCGB2L	
94	Hong Kong	Shanghai Commercial Bank	1978	SCBKGB2X	
95	China	Shanghai Pudong Development Bank	2023	SPDBGB2L	
96	South Korea	Shinhan Bank	2006	SHBKGB2L	
97	Sweden	Skandinaviska Enskilda Banken AB (Publ)	1993	ESSEGB2L	
98	France	Societe Generale	1993	SOGEGB2L	
99	India	State Bank of India	1946	SBINGB2L	
100	United States	State Street Bank and Trust Company	1993	SBOSGB2X	
101	Japan	Sumitomo Mitsui Banking Corporation	2017	SMBCGB3L	
102	Japan	Sumitomo Mitsui Trust Bank	1974	STBCGB2L	
103	Turkey	T.C. Ziraat Bankasi AS	1987	TCZBGB2L	
104	Hong Kong	The Bank of East Asia	1993	BEASGB2L	
105	United States	The Bank of New York Mellon	2023	MELNGB2D	
106	Canada	The Bank of Nova Scotia	1920	NOSCGB22	
107	Ireland	The Governor and Company of the Bank of Ireland	-	BOFIGB2B	
108	South Korea	The Korea Development Bank	1975	KODBGB2L	
109	Japan	The Norinchukin Bank	1991	NOCUGB2L	
110	United States	The Northern Trust Company	1962	CNORGB22	
111	Jersey	The Royal Bank of Scotland International trading as NatWest International	2017	RBSIGB2L	
112	Canada	The Toronto-Dominion Bank	1955	TDOMGB2L	
113	Turkey	Turkiye Is Bankasi As	1987	ISBKGB2L	
114	United States	U.S. Bank Europe DAC	2011	USBKGB22DSE	
115	Switzerland	UBS AG	1998	UBSWGB4L	
116	Switzerland	Union Bancaire Privee, UBP SA	1991	UBPGGB2X	
117	Singapore	United Overseas Bank	1975	UOVBGB2L	
118	United States	Wells Fargo Bank, National Association	2006	PNBPGB2L	
119	Australia	Westpac Banking Corporation	1993	WPACGB2L	
120	South Korea	Woori Bank	1978	HVBKGB2L	
Gibraltar banks
No.	Headquarters	Bank name	Established	SWIFT-BIC	Notes
121	Gibraltar	Bank J. Safra Sarasin (Gibraltar)	2007	BJSBGB2X	
122	Gibraltar	Gibraltar International Bank	-	-	
123	Gibraltar	Lombard Odier & Cie (Gibraltar)	-	-	
124	Gibraltar	Moneycorp Bank	1979	TTTMGB2L	
125	Gibraltar	The Royal Bank of Scotland (Gibraltar)	-	-	The undertaking of The Royal Bank of Scotland (Gibraltar) Limited, which carried on business in Gibraltar under the NatWest and RBS International brands, was transferred to The Royal Bank of Scotland International Limited in 2009.
126	Gibraltar	Trusted Novus Bank	-	-	
127	Gibraltar	Xapo Bank	-	-	
SRO banks
No.	Headquarters	Bank name	Established	SWIFT-BIC	Notes
128	Liechtenstein	Bank Frick AG	2011	-	
129	France	Banque Transatlantique SA	2008	CMCIGB31	
130	Netherlands	Bunq B.V.	-	-	
131	Belgium	Byblos Bank Europe SA	1993	BYBBGB2L	
132	Italy	FinecoBank SPA	2019	-	
133	Luxembourg	Intesa Sanpaolo Wealth Management SA	-	-	
134	Malta	Lidion Bank	-	-	
135	France	Milleis Banque	-	-	

== Building societies ==
According to data from the UK Prudential Regulation Authority (PRA), as of July 2025, there are 42 registered building societies in the UK, some of which also hold locally incorporated banks—such as Virgin Money UK, owned by Nationwide Building Society, and The Co-operative Bank, owned by Coventry Building Society; for further details, see the List of building societies in the United Kingdom.

== Credit unions ==
According to data from the UK Prudential Regulation Authority (PRA), as of July 2025, there are 366 registered credit unions in the UK; credit unions are member-owned financial cooperatives that provide savings and loan services, and they are authorised to accept deposits from their members.

Firm name	Established	SWIFT-BIC	Notes
1st Alliance (Ayrshire) Credit Union	-	AARUGB21	
1st Class Credit Union	1992	-	
Abbey Credit Union	1967	-	
Abronhill Credit Union	-	-	
Advance Credit Union	-	-	
Adventist Credit Union	-	-	
AlBirr Credit Union	-	-	
Annahoe Credit Union	1990	-	
Antonine Credit Union	1981	-	
Ardboe Credit Union	1969	-	
Armagh Credit Union	1962	-	
B C D Credit Union	-	-	
Bacup (Lancashire) Credit Union	1991	-	
BAG Credit Union	-	-	
Baillieston Credit Union	-	-	
Bakers Food and Allied Workers' Credit Union	1997	-	
Ballinascreen Credit Union	1968	-	
Ballinderry Bridge Credit Union	1969	-	
Ballycastle Credit Union	1965	-	
Ballyhackamore Credit Union	1970	-	
Ballykelly Credit Union	-	-	
Ballymacash Credit Union	1995	-	
Ballymena Credit Union	1967	-	
Ballynafeigh Credit Union	1996	-	
Ballynahinch Credit Union	-	-	
Banbridge Credit Union	1969	-	
Bannvale Credit Union	-	-	
Bannview Community Credit Union	-	-	
Basildon Credit Union	-	-	
BDS Credit Union	1969	-	
Bedford Credit Union	-	-	
Bedworth and Bulkington Credit Union	-	-	
Beechview Antigonish Credit Union	Before 1974	-	
Beewise Credit Union	-	-	
Belleek-Garrison Credit Union	1991	-	
Belvoir Credit Union	-	-	
Benarty and Lochgelly Credit Union	1989	-	
Benburb & Killyman Districts Credit Union	1992	-	
Beragh Credit Union	-	-	
Black Squirrel Credit Union	-	-	
Blackburn Seafield and District Credit Union	-	-	
Blackpool, Fylde & Wyre Credit Union	-	-	
Blantyre Credit Union	-	-	
Blues and Twos Credit Union	-	-	
Bradford District Credit Union	-	-	
Brent Shrine Credit Union	-	-	
Bridgend Lifesavers Credit Union	-	-	
Britannia Credit Union	-	-	
Brownlow (Lurgan) Credit Union	-	-	
Burnley West Credit Union	-	-	
Calderdale Credit Union	-	-	
Caledonian Credit Union	-	-	
Cambrian Credit Union	-	-	
Cambuslang Credit Union	-	-	
Camlin Credit Union	-	-	
Capital Credit Union	1989	-	
Cardiff and the Vale Credit Union	Before 1998	-	
Carlisle & District Credit Union	-	-	
Carnglen Credit Union	1977	-	
Carntyne and Riddrie Credit Union	-	-	
Carrickfergus Credit Union	-	-	
Cash Box Credit Union	2005	-	
Castle & Crystal Credit Union	-	-	
Castlederg & District No 12 Credit Union	-	-	
Castlemilk Credit Union	1990	-	
Celtic Credit Union	2005	-	
Central Liverpool Credit Union	1989	-	
Cheshire Neighbours Credit Union	-	-	
Chesterfield and North East Derbyshire Credit Union	1995	-	
Chryston and District Credit Union	-	-	
Churches' Mutual Credit Union	2014	-	
Circle Credit Union	-	-	
Citysave Credit Union	1988	-	
Clockwise Credit Union	1992	-	
Clogher Valley Credit Union	-	-	
Clonard Credit Union	1964	-	
Cloughfern Community Credit Union	1989	-	
Coagh & District Credit Union	-	-	
Coalisland Credit Union	1963	-	
Colburn Credit Union	-	-	
Colchester Credit Union	2002	-	
Comber Community Credit Union	1995	-	
Commonwealth Secretariat Staff Credit Union	1987	-	
Commsave Credit Union	1991	-	
Community First Credit Union	-	-	
Congleton Community Credit Union	1998	-	
Connection Credit Union	-	-	
Cookstown Credit Union	1965	-	
Court Credit Union	-	-	
Coventry & District Credit Union	-	-	
Cranhill Credit Union	1976	-	
Credit Union For South East Northumberland	1990	-	
Crossmaglen Credit Union	1973	-	
Croydon Caribbean Credit Union	1967	-	
Croydon, Merton & Sutton Credit Union	1999	-	
Cumbernauld Central Credit Union	-	-	
Cumbernauld South Credit Union	-	-	
Dacorum First Credit Union	-	-	
Dalmuir Credit Union	1977	-	
Dalriada Credit Union	-	-	
Darlington Credit Union	-	DARNGB21	
Derry Credit Union	1960	-	
Derrygonnelly Credit Union	1971	-	
Desertmartin Credit Union	1971	-	
Dial-A-Cab Credit Union	2020	-	
Discovery Credit Union	-	-	
Divisview Antigonish Credit Union	-	-	
Downpatrick Credit Union	-	-	
Dragonsavers Credit Union	2003	-	
Dromara & Drumgooland Credit Union	1971	-	
Dromore (Tyrone) Credit Union	1967	-	
Drumchapel Community Credit Union	1970	-	
Dumbarton Credit Union	1990	-	
Dundonald Credit Union	1985	-	
Dungannon Credit Union	1964	-	
Dungiven Credit Union	-	-	
East Kilbride Credit Union	-	-	
East Sussex Credit Union	-	-	
Eastern Savings and Loans Credit Union	2001	-	
Ederney Credit Union	1982	-	
Enniskillen Credit Union	1968	-	
Enterprise Credit Union	-	-	
Erewash Credit Union	-	ERCIGB21	
Erne Credit Union	1992	-	
Fairfield Govan Credit Union	1998	-	
Fairhill & District Credit Union	1991	-	
Fairshare Credit Union	-	-	
Fairywater Credit Union	1981	-	
Falkirk District Credit Union	1995	-	
Faughanvale Credit Union	1971	-	
Felix Credit Union (Bradford)	1979	-	
Fintona Credit Union	1967	-	
Firesave Credit Union	-	-	
First Choice Credit Union	-	-	
First Rate Credit Union	1982	-	
First Scottish University Credit Union	1991	-	
First Shipbuilders Credit Union	-	-	
Flamesavers Credit Union	1992	-	
Frontier Credit Union	-	-	
Fusion Credit Union	-	-	
Gateway Credit Union	1996	-	
Glasgow Credit Union	1989	-	
Glasgow South Credit Union	2002	-	
Glasgow West Credit Union	-	-	
Gleniffer Credit Union	1988	-	
Grampian Credit Union	1993	-	
Great North Two Thousand (Transport) Credit Union	1990	-	
Great Western Credit Union	Before 1999	-	
Greater Govan Credit Union	1997	-	
Greater Springburn Credit Union	1990	-	
Greenwich & Bexley Credit Union	1999	-	
Haghill Dennistoun Credit Union	1992	-	
Halton Credit Union	2002	-	
Hamilton Road Credit Union	1991	-	
Hampshire Credit Union	-	-	
Hannahstown Credit Union	1971	-	
Harp and Crown Credit Union	1998	-	
HertSavers Credit Union	-	-	
Hillingdon Credit Union	1991	-	
Holdfast Credit Union	1992	-	
Hoot Credit Union	2005	-	
Hull and East Yorkshire Credit Union	-	HEYCGB21	
Irvinestown Credit Union	1971	-	
Islay & Jura Credit Union	2002	-	
Johnstone Credit Union	1979	-	
Jubilee Tower Credit Union	1996	-	
Just Credit Union	-	-	
Keady Credit Union	1967	-	
Keep Credit Union	1988	-	
Kernow Credit Union	2004	-	
Kildress Credit Union	1970	-	
Kilkeel Credit Union	1968	-	
Kilrea and District No 5 Credit Union	1989	-	
Kilsyth and Villages Credit Union	-	-	
Kingdom Credit Union	-	-	
Kingdom of Mourne Credit Union	1995	-	
Kirklands Credit Union	-	-	
Knightscliffe Temple Credit Union	-	-	
Knockninny Credit Union	-	-	
Knowsley Mutual Credit Union	-	-	
KRD Credit Union	-	-	
Lagan Valley Credit Union	-	-	
Lakeland Credit Union	-	-	
Larne Credit Union	1973	-	
LASER Credit Union	2003	-	
Lecale Credit Union	-	-	
Leeds City Credit Union	1987	-	
Leicester Caribbean Credit Union	1973	-	
Levern Credit Union	2005	-	
Lewisham Plus Credit Union	1992	-	
Liberty Credit Union	-	-	
Limavady Credit Union	1971	-	
Link Credit Union	-	-	
Lisbellaw Credit Union	1990	-	
Lisburn Credit Union	1970	-	
Lisnaskea Credit Union	1975	-	
LIVERPOOL COMMUNITY CREDIT UNION	1991	-	
Llanelli and District Credit Union	1998	-	
Llynfi Valley Credit Union	1994	-	
Lodge Lane and District (Liverpool) Credit Union	1989	-	
London Capital Credit Union	1997	-	
London Community Credit Union	2000	-	
London Mutual Credit Union	1982	-	
London Plus Credit Union	2008	-	
London Taxi Drivers Credit Union	1979	-	
Loughguile Credit Union	-	-	
Lurgan Credit Union	1963	-	
M for Money Credit Union	-	-	
M W S (Wrekin) Credit Union	1990	-	
Macnean Credit Union	1989	-	
Maghera Credit Union	-	-	
Magherafelt & District No 3 Credit Union	1988	-	
Magherafelt Credit Union	1966	-	
Magilligan Credit Union	1971	-	
Mallard Credit Union	-	-	
Manchester Credit Union	1991	-	
Medway Credit Union	1999	-	
Mendip Community Credit Union	2000	-	
Metro Moneywise Credit Union	1990	-	
Mid-Tyrone Credit Union	1992	-	
Money Box Credit Union	-	-	
Money Matters Credit Union	1995	-	
MoneyWise Credit Union	1990	-	
Moray Firth Credit Union	1993	-	
Morecambe Bay Credit Union	2000	-	
Mosshill Credit Union	1980	-	
Motherwell and District Credit Union	1992	-	
Mourne Valley Credit Union	1995	-	
Mournederg Credit Union	-	-	
Moy Credit Union	1971	-	
Moyenir Credit Union	1967	-	
Moyola & Toome Credit Union	-	-	
Muckamore Credit Union	1991	-	
NEFirst Credit Union	2013	-	
New Easterhouse Credit Union	1991	-	
New Horizons Credit Union	2001	-	
Newarthill Credit Union	1980	-	
Newington Credit Union	1967	-	
Newmains and District Credit Union	1993	-	
Newmount Credit Union	1971	-	
Newry Credit Union	1963	-	
Newtownards Credit Union	1993	-	
Newtownbutler Credit Union	1993	-	
Newtownhamilton Credit Union	1967	-	
NFRN Credit Union	2006	-	
NHS (Scotland and North England) Credit Union	1998	NHCUGB21	
No 5 Credit Union	1989	-	
Norfolk First Credit Union	1989	-	
North Belfast Credit Union	1998	-	
North Coatbridge Credit Union	1994	-	
North East Fife Credit Union	1999	-	
North Edinburgh and Castle Credit Union	2002	-	
North Tyneside Employees Credit Union	1989	-	
North Tyrone Credit Union	1967	-	
Norwich Credit Union	1989	-	
Nottingham Credit Union	2001	-	
Number One Police Credit Union	1986	-	
Oldham Credit Union	2002	-	
Omagh Credit Union	1965	-	
Open University Employees Credit Union	1994	-	
Orchard Credit Union	1990	-	
Ormeau Credit Union	1964	-	
Owenkillew Credit Union	1980	-	
P.B.F.A. Credit Union	-	-	
Partners Credit Union	1993	-	
PCB	-	-	
Penilee Credit Union	1986	-	
Pennine Community Credit Union	1982	-	
Penny Post Credit Union	1996	-	
Pennyburn Credit Union	1966	-	
Pioneer Credit Union Middlesbrough Community Bank	-	-	
Pitney-Bowes Employees Credit Union	1980	-	
Plane Saver Credit Union	1993	-	
Pollok Credit Union	1993	-	
Pomeroy Credit Union	1965	-	
Portadown Credit Union	2012	-	
Portaferry Credit Union	1965	-	
R.M.T. Credit Union	-	-	
Rathfriland Credit Union	1999	-	
Reading Njangi Of Cameroonians (Rencam) Credit Union	2012	-	
Riada Credit Union	1994	-	
Right Way Credit Union	2003	-	
Riverside Credit Union	1989	-	
Roe Valley Credit Union	1991	-	
Roslea Credit Union	1990	-	
Ruchill Credit Union	1989	-	
S C V O Credit Union	1998	-	
S.A.G. Credit Union	1964	-	
Sale Credit Union	1995	-	
Salford Credit Union	1988	-	
Scottish Police Credit Union	1989	-	
Scottish Transport Credit Union	1981	-	
Scotwest Credit Union	1991	-	
Sefton Credit Union	1989	-	
Serve and Protect Credit Union	2003	-	
Shaftesbury Credit Union	1986	-	
Sheffield Credit Union	2004	-	
Shettleston and Tollcross Credit Union	1993	-	
Sion Mills Credit Union	1971	-	
Sixmilecross & District Credit Union	1992	-	
Skea Credit Union	1990	-	
Slemish n tha Braid Credit Union	2007	-	
Slieve Gullion Credit Union	1969	-	
Smart Money Cymru Credit Union	1989	-	
Society Credit Union	1872	-	
Solway Credit Union	1999	-	
Somerset Community Credit Union	1998	-	
South Bank Savings and Credit Union	1989	-	
South Coatbridge Credit Union	1997	-	
South Fermanagh Credit Union	1971	-	
South Manchester Credit Union	2000	-	
Southdene Credit Union	1987	-	
Sovereign Credit Union	2001	-	
St Aidan and Oswalds K.S.C. Royton Credit Union	1991	-	
St Albans District Credit Union	-	-	
St Gregory's Credit Union	1995	-	
St Machar Credit Union	1990	-	
St Therese's (Port Talbot) Credit Union	1980s	-	
St Wilfrid and Mother of God Credit Union	1981	-	
St. Francis Xavier and St. Mary's Credit Union	1995	-	
Stevenage Credit Union	1995	-	
Stockport Credit Union	2002	-	
Strabane Credit Union	1960	-	
Stramore Community Credit Union	1998	-	
Stranraer Credit Union	1999	-	
Suffolk Credit Union	-	-	
Taxi Trade Credit Union	1980	-	
Tay Valley Credit Union	1995	-	
Teachers' Credit Union	1965	-	
Templemore Credit Union	1990	-	
Termonmaguirk Credit Union	1970	-	
Thamesbank Credit Union	2005	-	
The Chaplaincy Savings and Credit Union	1982	-	
The Co-Operative Family Credit Union	1998	-	
The Merthyr Tydfil Borough Credit Union	1998	-	
The Wirral Credit Union	1992	-	
Thorne Credit Union	1999	-	
Thorniewood Credit Union	1994	-	
Torrent Credit Union	1971	-	
Tower Hamlets (Green Light) Credit Union	1980	-	
TPM Credit Union	1967	-	
Transave Credit Union	1996	-	
Tullycarnet Credit Union	1996	-	
Unify Credit Union	2002	-	
Unity Credit Union	1984	-	
Vale of Leven Credit Union	1980	-	
Victoria Credit Union	-	-	
W.H.E.B. Credit Union	1995	-	
Walsave Credit Union	1996	-	
Waltham Forest Council Employee Credit Union	-	-	
Waterside Credit Union	1964	-	
Watford Credit Union	-	-	
WBR Credit Union	1971	-	
West Cheshire Credit Union	-	-	
West Sussex and Surrey Credit Union	-	WSCUGB21	
West Tyrone Credit Union	-	-	
Western Isles Credit Union	-	-	
Weston Super Mare and District Credit Union	-	-	
Wherry Dragon Credit Union	-	-	
White Cart Credit Union	-	-	
Whitehaven Egremont and District Credit Union	-	-	
Willowfield Credit Union	-	-	
Wiltshire and Swindon Credit Union	-	-	
Wishaw Credit Union	-	-	
Wolverhampton City Credit Union	-	-	
YOURB CREDIT UNION	-	-	

== See also ==
- Banking in the United Kingdom
- List of banks in Europe
- Lists of banks
