= Farrow & Ball =

British paint and wallpaper manufacturer

Farrow & Ball Limited
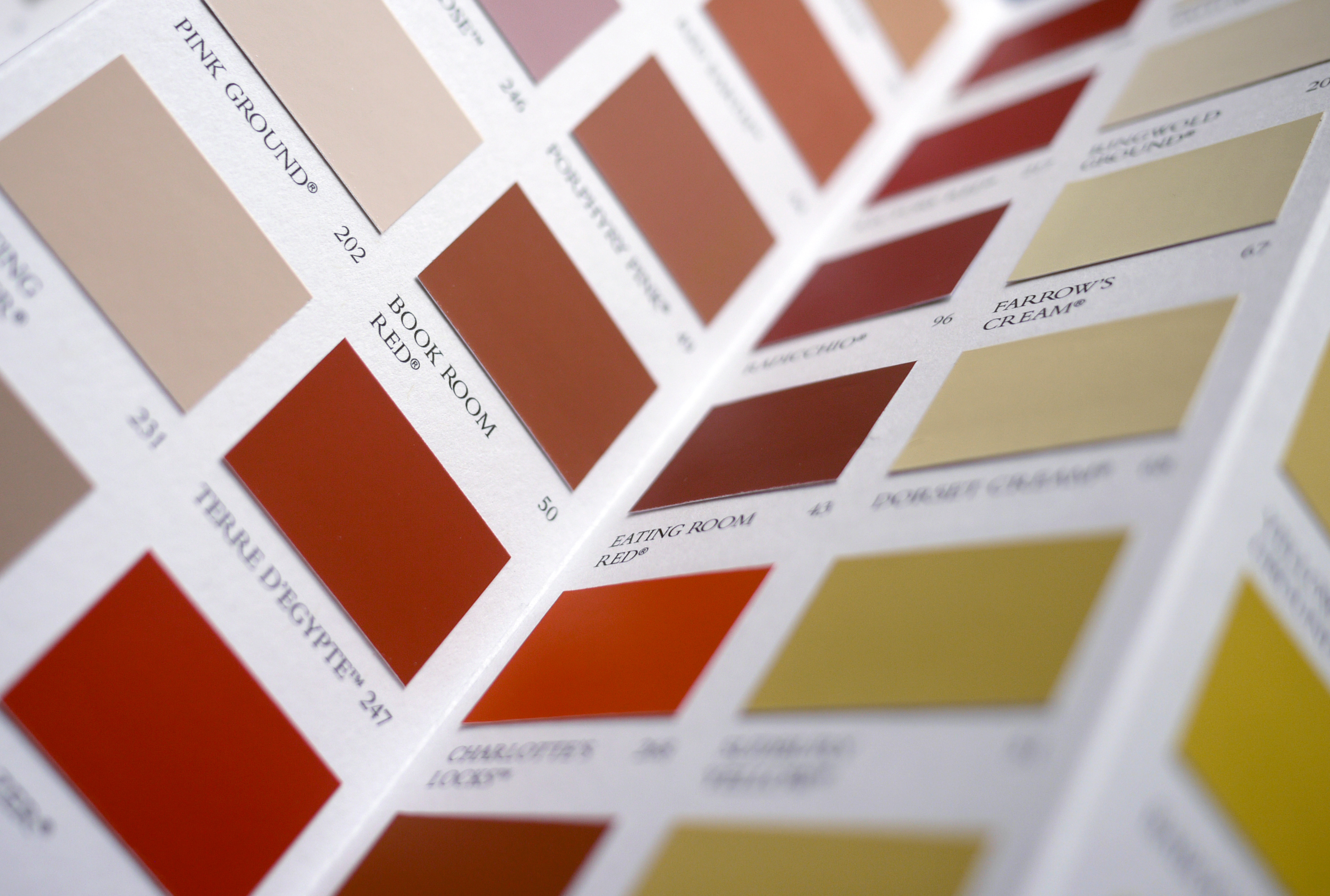
- A Farrow & Ball colour swatch
- Formerly: Farrow & Ball (Southern) Limited
- Type: Private limited company
- Founded: 1946; 80 years ago; Incorporated 18 January 1971; 55 years ago
- Founders: John Farrow; Richard Ball
- Headquarters: Wimborne, Dorset, United Kingdom
- Number of locations: 45 company-operated stores; 1,491 third-party stockist locations; (29 March 2020)
- Products: Paint; Wallpaper
- Net income: £16,030,000 (2019/2020)
- Total assets: £95,295,000 (29 March 2020)
- Number of employees: 550 (2019/2020)
- Parent: Hempel
- Website: farrow-ball.com

Farrow & Ball is a British manufacturer of paints and wallpapers largely based upon historic colour palettes and archives. The company is particularly well known for the unusual names of its products.

== History ==
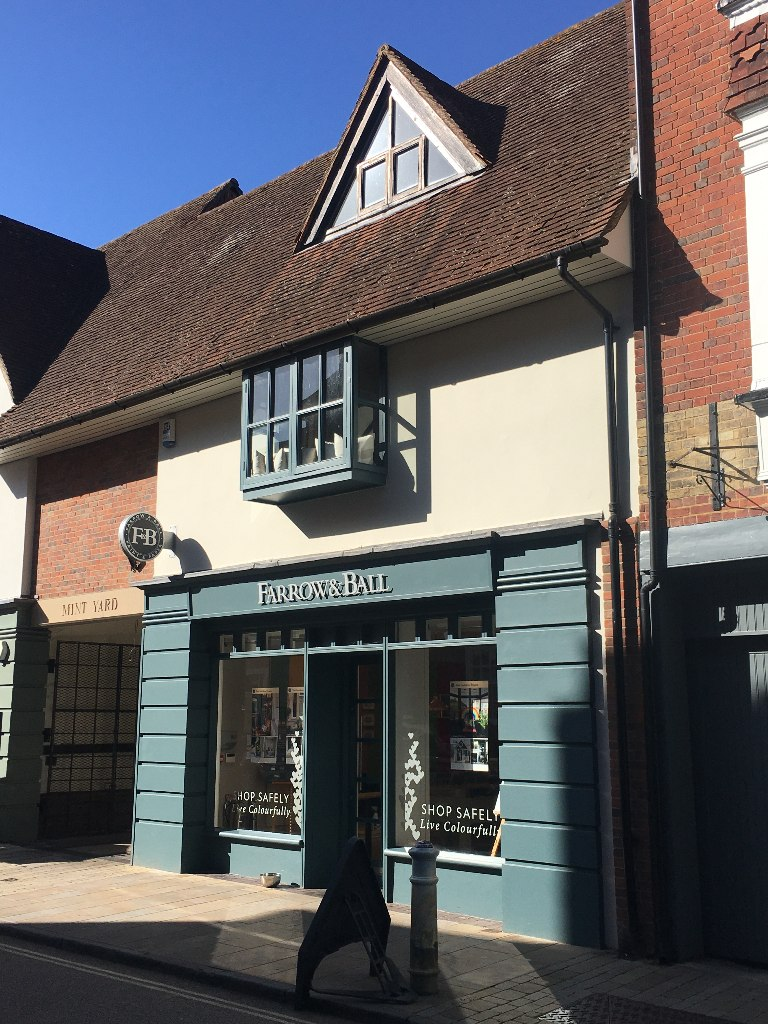
Farrow & Ball branch in Winchester

The company was started by John Farrow and Richard Maurice Ball in 1946 in Wimborne Minster, Dorset. Both Farrow and Ball had previously been chemists. The company was the first manufacturer to switch to the production of 100 per cent water-based paints in 2010.

== Products ==
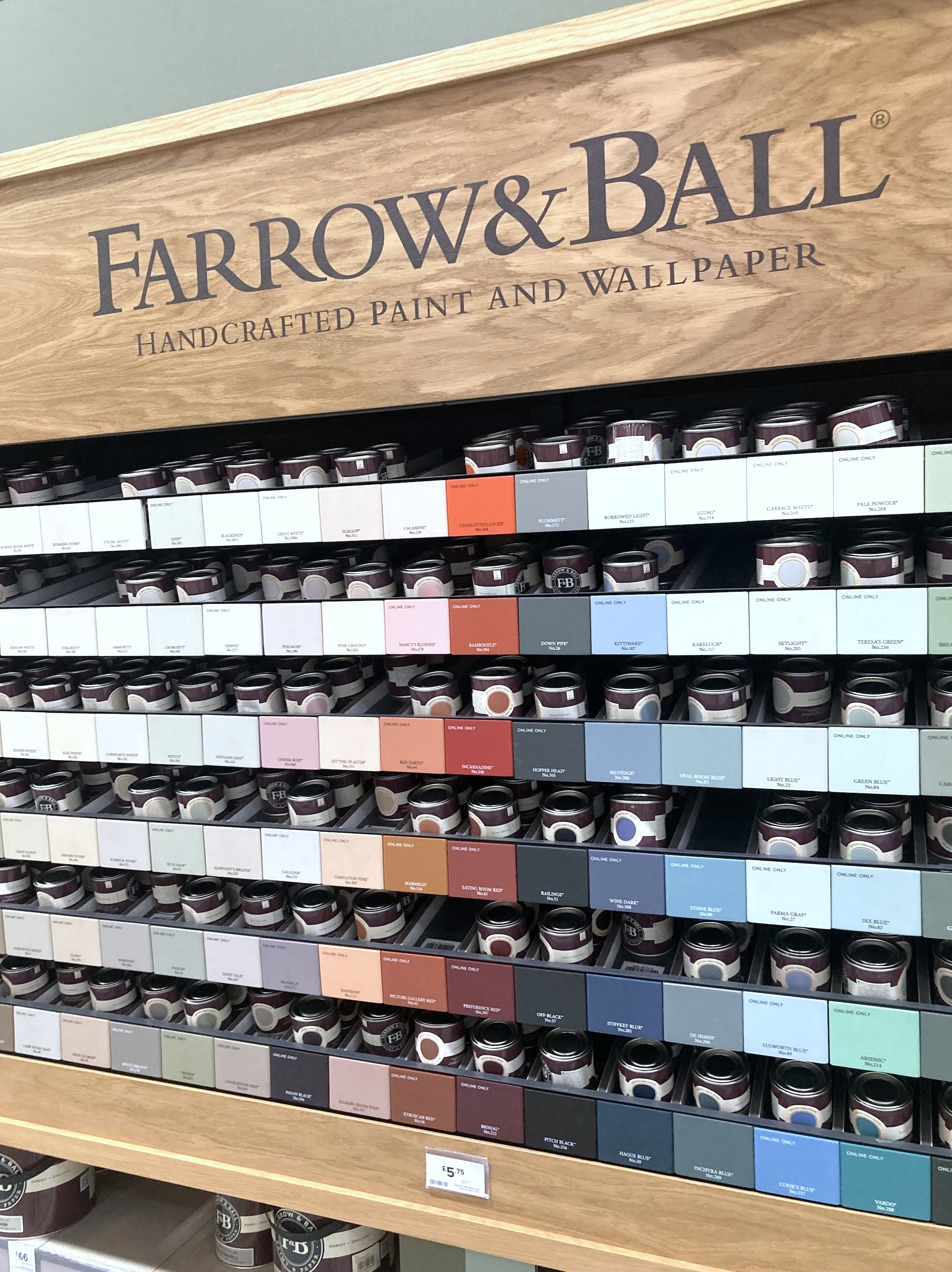
Paints by Farrow and Ball

=== Paint ===
Farrow & Ball maintains an updated colour card of 132 colours, plus 12 new paint colours and 3 new wallpaper patterns created with Christopher John Rogers. The company has worked with the National Trust in formulating near-exact matches of colours used in the restoration of the interiors and exteriors of historic buildings.

=== Wallpaper ===
Farrow & Ball produces wallpaper patterns made using traditional block, trough and roller methods with the company's own paint.

=== Books ===
Farrow & Ball has produced several books; the British National Bibliography contains the following records:

- Paint and Colour in Decoration (2003)
- Farrow & Ball The Art of Colour (2007)
- Farrow & Ball Living with Colour (2010)
- Farrow & Ball Decorating with Colour (2013)
- Farrow & Ball How to Decorate (2016)
- Farrow & Ball Recipes for Decorating (2019)

== Showrooms and stockists ==
The company has 63 showrooms across the UK, US, Canada and Europe, as well as a global network of stockists carrying both paint and wallpaper.

== In popular culture ==
Farrow & Ball has been lampooned in the US for its expense and preparation requirements on NBC's Saturday Night Live.

In 2021, Channel 5 broadcast a one episode documentary about Farrow & Ball entitled Farrow & Ball: Inside the Posh Paint Factory.

== Corporate information ==
=== Ownership ===
In 2006, American Capital subsidiary European Capital Limited purchased Farrow & Ball for approximately £80 million by way of a management buyout. Until its sale to European Capital Limited, Farrow & Ball remained a family business. In 2014, Ares Management bought Farrow & Ball from European Capital Limited for £275 million. In October 2020, Bloomberg reported that Ares Management was considering a potential sale of Farrow & Ball. In May 2021, the Financial Times reported that Danish coatings manufacturer Hempel had agreed to purchase Farrow & Ball from Ares Management for approximately £500 million. The sale was expected to complete in the second half of 2021. On 26 August 2021, the Competition and Markets Authority (CMA) completed the phase one investigation it launched on 9 July 2021 and cleared the merger. Following clearance by the CMA, the sale of Farrow & Ball by Ares Management to Hempel completed on 3 September 2021.

=== Financial information ===
Financial year	Turnover (£)	Gross profit (£)	Operating profit (£)	Profit after tax (£)	Total comprehensive income (£)
2019/2020	76,574,000	54,264,000	19,763,000	16,030,000	16,402,000
2018/2019	73,915,000	52,100,000	18,336,000	14,773,000	14,773,000
2017/2018	73,451,000	53,164,000	19,770,000	15,919,000	15,919,000
2016/2017	74,934,000	54,474,000	22,781,000	17,854,000	17,854,000
2015/2016	65,684,000	47,221,000	18,391,000	15,577,000	15,577,000

== Bibliography ==
- Friedman, Joseph. Paint and Color in Decoration. Rizzoli New York: 2003. ISBN 0-8478-2593-0.
