= Atom Bank =

Retail bank in the United Kingdom

Atom bank plc
- Type: Public limited company
- Industry: Personal Finance; Banking
- Founded: 31 July 2013; 13 years ago
- Founder: Anthony Thomson; Mark Mullen
- Headquarters: Newcastle upon Tyne, England, UK
- Revenue: ▲£99.1 million (2024)
- Operating income: ▲£6.7 million (2023)
- Net income: ▲£12.5 million (2024)
- Total assets: ▼£7.2 billion (2024)
- Total equity: ▲£403.8 million (2024)
- Number of employees: ▲504 (2024)
- Website: atombank.co.uk

Atom Bank plc is a retail bank in the United Kingdom. It is the United Kingdom's first bank built for smartphone or tablet, without any branches, and the first digital-only challenger bank to be granted a full UK regulatory licence. The company is based in Newcastle upon Tyne, England.

Atom is authorised by the Prudential Regulation Authority (PRA) and regulated by the Financial Conduct Authority (FCA) and the PRA.

== History ==
Atom was founded in July 2013 by Anthony Thomson, co-founder of Metro Bank and Mark Mullen, previous CEO at First Direct.

In June 2015, Atom was granted a banking licence and before launch in November 2015, Spanish bank BBVA agreed to invest a substantial stake in Atom. The company launched to the public in April 2016, after its regulatory authorisation restrictions were lifted, initially to those who had expressed an interest previously and had been given a registration code. It launched more widely in October 2016 and today it offers mortgages and savings accounts, along with secured loans for small businesses.

In 2017, Atom was named by LinkedIn as one of the top 25 startups impacting the UK and ranked 14th alongside companies such as Deliveroo, Uber and Airbnb, and in 2019, Atom ranked second in business analyst Beauhurst's list of 50 top fintech UK startups and scale-ups. It was the only company from outside London in the top 20 of the list.

In November 2023, Atom raised £100 million from BBVA, Toscafund and Infinity Investments Partners.

In June 2024, Atom Bank criticized large UK lenders for their "indifferent" customer service while celebrating a record year of profits, reporting a £27 million operating profit, about seven times higher than the previous year, and its first annual pre-tax profit since launching a decade ago. Atom saw a 39% increase in customer borrowing to £4.1 billion and a 55% rise in residential mortgage balances, maintaining low business costs and raising £100 million from investors.

== Mobile app ==
Atom has apps for iOS and Android phones, offering biometric security, with customers able to sign in via face ID or voice ID.

== See also ==
- List of banks in the United Kingdom
