= Allica Bank =

UK business bank

Allica Bank Limited
- Type: Private
- Industry: Financial services
- Founded: 2019; 7 years ago
- Headquarters: London, Milton Keynes
- Area served: United Kingdom
- Key people: Richard Davies (CEO)
- Products: Business banking
- Revenue: ▲£371.3 million (2025)
- Net income: ▲£36.9 million (2025)
- Number of employees: ▲799 (2025)
- Website: www.allica.bank

Allica Bank is a British challenger bank and fintech headquartered in London and Milton Keynes. It offers a range of lending, savings and current account products to established small and medium-sized businesses (SMEs) in the UK.

Allica Bank acquired its banking licence from the Prudential Regulation Authority in 2019. In June 2024, it was revealed as the UK's fastest-growing private company in The Sunday Times 100, after having also been named as the UK's fastest-growing fintech ever in Deloitte's 2023 UK Tech Fast 50.

== History ==
Allica appointed Revolut's former chief operating officer Richard Davies as its CEO in July 2020.

Allica Bank launched its business current account in January 2023. By the end of the year it was reported to have 2,000 business current account customers. That same year, Allica revealed it achieved its first full-year profit and that it had lent over £2 billion to SME businesses since it launched. This represented an increase of 47% on the previous year.

In March 2025, Allica was listed as the second fastest growing company in Europe in the FT1000, the list of Europe’s 1,000 fastest growing companies for 2025, compiled by the Financial Times.

In Allica's 2025 annual results, it revealed it had reached over 14,000 business current account customers, with total lending reaching more than £3.7 billion.

Allica achieved unicorn status in February 2026 with a valuation of $1.2 billion. At the time it said it had over 30,000 business customers across its current account, savings and lending products.

== Fundraising ==
Warwick Capital Partners led a £26 million funding round in Allica Bank in September 2020.

In late-November 2021, Allica Bank announced it had closed a £110 million Series B fundraise, led by new investor Atalaya Capital Management, along with existing investor, Warwick Capital Partners.

In June 2022, Allica Bank raised a further £55 million from existing investors Warwick and Atalaya, and British Business Investments (part of the British Business Bank).

TCV, a leading global technology investor, led a £100 million funding round in Allica Bank in December 2022, alongside existing investors Warwick and Atalaya.

Allica achieved unicorn status in February 2026 with a valuation of $1.2 billion. It followed a $155 million funding round, including investors Ventura Capital, GLG, Sona AM and existing investors TCV and Blue Owl.

== Acquisitions ==
In August 2024, Allica acquired specialist bridging lender Tuscan Capital.

In November 2021, Allica Bank acquired Allied Irish Banks's British SME lending portfolio, composed of about £600 million of loans to 2,000 customers. The process was reported to have completed in August 2022.

Allica entered the invoice finance and embedded payments space with the acquisition of Kriya in October 2025. It said it was aiming to achieve £1 billion of invoice finance lending by 2028.

== Locations ==
Allica Bank's main headquarters are in London and Milton Keynes. It also has an office in Manchester.
