= Post Office Money =

- Company type: Trading name
- Industry: Financial services
- Headquarters: London
- Area served: United Kingdom
- Products: Credit cards Current accounts Mortgages; Personal loans
- Owner: HM Government
- Parent: Post Office Limited
- Website: www.postoffice.co.uk/banking-and-bills

Post Office Money is a financial services brand operated by Post Office Limited which provides savings accounts, credit cards and insurance products to customers in the United Kingdom through Post Office branches, the internet and telephone.

Post Office Money was launched in 2015 to provide an umbrella brand for all financial services provided through Post Office Ltd. Many Post Office Money branded products are provided by Bank of Ireland (UK) plc with Post Office Ltd acting as an appointed representative and credit broker.

== Products and services ==
=== Savings ===
The Post Office had long been an agent for National Savings and Investments (NS&I), which was originally the Post Office Savings Bank but is now a wholly separate institution. From November 2011, only Premium Bonds could be bought in Post Offices, but the 156-year relationship ended in August 2015 when Premium Bonds became the final NS&I product to be withdrawn from sale at Post Office counters.

Post Office Money offers its own range of savings products, which are sometimes in competition with those offered by NS&I. including an online savings account and a Post Office ISA.

=== Credit cards ===
Post Office branded credit cards have also been introduced. Accounts opened before July 2019 were provided by Bank of Ireland UK and subsequently transferred to JaJa Finance and accounts opened after November 2019 are provided by Capital One.

=== Insurance ===
Post Office Money provides a number of branded insurance products for cars, vans and motorbikes; home insurance (buildings and/or contents); pet insurance and travel insurance. Life insurance, over 50s life cover and lifestyle protection insurance are also available.

=== Currency cards ===
A Post Office Travel Money Card in a range of foreign currencies is available, issued by First Rate Exchange Services Ltd.

=== Discontinued products ===
==== Current accounts ====
In 2013, Post Office Ltd introduced a range of current accounts on a trial basis, initially at a small number of branches in East Anglia. This trial was extended to over 200 branches across the UK in 2014. Three accounts were offered, a standard account with optional overdraft, a basic bank account and a packaged account offering travel insurance and breakdown cover. Although these accounts could only be opened at participating branches, they can be managed across the whole network and through online, telephone and mobile banking systems. As in the case of most other Post Office branded financial products, Post Office current accounts were provided by Bank of Ireland (UK) plc with Post Office Ltd acting as an appointed representative. Following review of services by Bank of Ireland (UK) plc, it was decided in March 2019 that new Post Office Money current accounts would no longer be able to be opened and all remaining accounts were closed on 11 September 2019.

==== Post Office Card Account ====
The Post Office Card Account (POCA) was a cash handling account allowing customers to receive benefit payments. The Card Account could not be accessed anywhere other than a Post Office Counter or ATM at a post office branch. These accounts could only receive Department for Work and Pensions benefit payments and HMRC Tax Credits and Child Benefit payments. Housing Benefit from a local authority for example, must be paid elsewhere. If the account remains dormant for one year, it is closed. These accounts were run by J.P. Morgan Europe Ltd on behalf of the Post Office. To open an account, you must have been in receipt of benefits and a referral is made via Jobcentre Plus. New applications for a Post Office card account were closed on 11 May 2020, with existing accounts remaining open until November 2022. At this point, recipients who are unable to open traditional bank accounts will be moved over to a new Payment Exception Service which will allow them to continue to receive benefits at PayPoint and Post Office outlets using a plastic card, text message or email voucher.

==== Mortgages and loans ====
Post Office Money offered mortgages and personal loans, although the latter were marketed purely through the company's website and not through the branch network. The first loans, provided by Bank of Ireland, launched in 2004. Existing loans were sold to Antelope Loans or Link Financial Outsourcing Ltd in May 2025.

==== Prepaid cards ====
The Post Office Money Card was a prepaid MasterCard that was available in Pound Sterling and was issued by R. Raphael & Sons plc. This card was withdrawn in January 2017.

== See also ==
- Post Office Ltd
- Bank of Ireland
- National Girobank
