= Reliance Bank =

Bank founded in 1890

Reliance Bank Limited
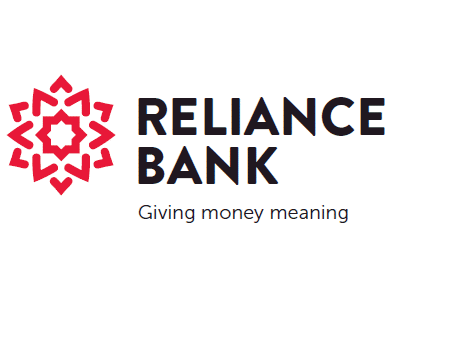
- Type: Private
- Industry: Financial services
- Founded: 1892
- Headquarters: London, United Kingdom
- Products: Financial services
- Revenue: ▼£10.2 million (2009)
- Operating income: ▲£4.1 million (2009)
- Net income: ▲£1.9 million (2009)
- Number of employees: 23 (2009)
- Parent: The Salvation Army International Trustee Company (51%); The Salvation Army Trustee Company (49%)
- Website: reliancebankltd.com

Reliance Bank Limited, formerly known as The Salvation Army Bank, is a bank founded in 1890 by William Booth. When Booth needed to attract investments to finance mortgages on property vital to the work of the movement, his response was to set up a bank.

== History ==
Founded by William Booth in 1890 as The Salvation Army Deposit Bank, the bank was registered in 1891 as The Salvation Army Bank. Out of the bank's expansion, grew the need for limited liability status and in 1901, The Salvation Army Bank became Reliance Bank Limited.

Today, the Salvation Army International Trustee Company still retain sole ownership of the bank and each year receive a share of the bank's allowable profits (a total of £12 million over the last 10 years). In addition to The Salvation Army it is also used by private customers, other churches, charities, and businesses.

The Reliance Bank is not a clearing bank and uses the National Westminster Bank to act as its agent in this respect. It is registered with the UK financial services regulator, the FCA.

In April 2021, Reliance Bank ceased offering Personal Current Accounts to new customers.
