= Girobank =

Former British bank

National Girobank
- Type: Statutory corporation (1968); Public limited company (1988)
- Industry: Financial services
- Founded: 1968; 58 years ago
- Defunct: 2003
- Fate: Privatised
- Successor: Alliance & Leicester
- Headquarters: Bootle, Merseyside
- Products: Postal giro, retail banking

National Girobank was a British public sector financial institution run by the General Post Office that opened for business in October 1968. It was initially called National Giro then National Girobank and finally Girobank plc, before being absorbed into Alliance & Leicester in 2003.

It was the first bank in Europe to adopt OCR (optical character recognition) technology; the first bank to offer interest-bearing current accounts, and the first in Europe to offer telephone banking.

== History ==
=== Background ===
In 1959, the Radcliffe Committee set up to investigate the "Working of the Monetary System in the United Kingdom" recommended the introduction of a giro system, and said that if the main banks did not do this, the possibility of the Post Office introducing it should be investigated.

=== Planning for the National Giro ===
In 1965 a white paper "A Post Office Giro" was published, outlining a system which would use post offices as its business outlets, with automated central processing of transactions.

By September 1965, a central site was chosen at Bootle in Lancashire. The Post Office bought land on the site of sidings of the North Mersey Branch railway. It also built a large, purpose built office and data processing complex for the site, completed in March 1968. The National Giro was the first financial institution in Europe, and probably the world, to be established from the outset to be fully computerised.

=== Operations ===
The early years of National Giro were unprofitable.

The most prolific user of the National Giro was the British government, which used giro cheques to effect unemployment benefit and social security payments. These cheques were sent by post to the beneficiaries, who could cash them at a post office, and they became known colloquially as 'giros'. From 2003 such payments were switched to the electronic payments system run by commercial banks.

In 1969 National Giro partnered with the Mercantile Loan Company to provide loans to account holders, which was a significant stimulation of account growth. When a Conservative government came to power in 1970, there were pressures on the government to close the still loss-making operation. The government, with the advice of consultants Cooper Brothers, gave its approval to a continuation plan. However, charges were doubled for the majority of customers, the 'same day' service was changed to a 'next day' service, and staffing was reduced from 3,500 to 3,000.

By the late 1980s, Girobank had overcome its shaky start and had grown rapidly to become Britain's sixth biggest bank.

=== Privatisation and beyond ===
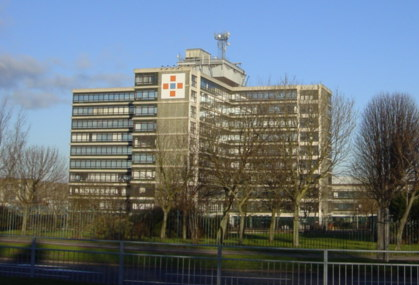
The Bootle office after privatisation, bearing the Alliance & Leicester logo

Alliance & Leicester – at that time a building society – won a bidding process for the Girobank operation in 1989 after the Conservative government privatised the bank, as part of a programme of sales of state-owned businesses. The transaction was completed in 1990 and by this time the bank was essentially indistinguishable from its competitors, apart from its use of post offices to transact cash business. The contract with the Post Office was to continue to be an exclusive one for a fixed period after privatisation. After privatisation, the bank expanded and opened a £9.5 million operations centre in Wigan.

The personal banking business of Girobank became part of the Alliance & Leicester Building Society. The business banking arm continued to use the Girobank name as a wholly owned subsidiary of the Alliance and Leicester, repositioned as a cash handler and credit card processor for retailers and other banks. In 2003 the Girobank brand was dropped, with the business renamed Alliance & Leicester following further consolidation in the Alliance & Leicester group. In May 2010, Alliance & Leicester was acquired by Grupo Santander and the Alliance & Leicester brand was replaced by Santander UK.

The Girobank wording continued in use on some credit slips intended for paying bills, along with the Alliance & Leicester "plus" logo. Some councils were continuing to use the original name "Post Office Giro" in 2011.

In March 2009, a campaign was launched to bring back Girobank. Backers included MPs, trade unions and small businesses.

In 2021, Santander ceased using the Bootle office building and sold the site for redevelopment; demolition began in 2023.

=== Successors ===
Post Office Limited now provides cash services to many banks on a commercial basis. In April 2013, the Post Office announced it would be launching a retail banking service accessible through Post Office branches under the Post Office Money brand, now run by the Bank of Ireland.
