= J.P. Morgan in the United Kingdom =

JPMorgan Chase is an American multinational banking corporation with a large presence in the United Kingdom. The corporation's European subsidiaries J.P. Morgan Europe Limited, J.P. Morgan International Bank Limited and J.P. Morgan Securities plc are headquartered in London.

== History ==
J.P. Morgan's founder is J. Pierpont Morgan. His father, Junius Spencer Morgan, was in the merchant banking business in London from 1854 until his death in 1890. In 1873, the Scottish American Investment Trust, a predecessor firm (Robert Fleming & Co. was sold to Chase Manhattan in 2000), was formed. In 1887, Jarvis-Conklin Mortgage Trust Company opened in London, and through a series of mergers and reorganizations, this firm became part of Chase Bank.

The bank joined CHAPS in 2010.

The company provided the Post Office card account between 2006 and 2022, acquired investment bank Cazenove in 2010 and acquired London based online investment firm Nutmeg in June 2021. JPMorgan Chase launched a retail banking operation in the UK in September 2021 under the Chase UK brand name.

== Locations ==
J.P. Morgan Chase does not operate bank branches in the UK but has offices in London (which serves as the headquarters), Bournemouth, Glasgow and Edinburgh. The Bournemouth office is the largest private sector employer in Dorset, while in Glasgow J.P. Morgan is one of the largest technology employers in Scotland.

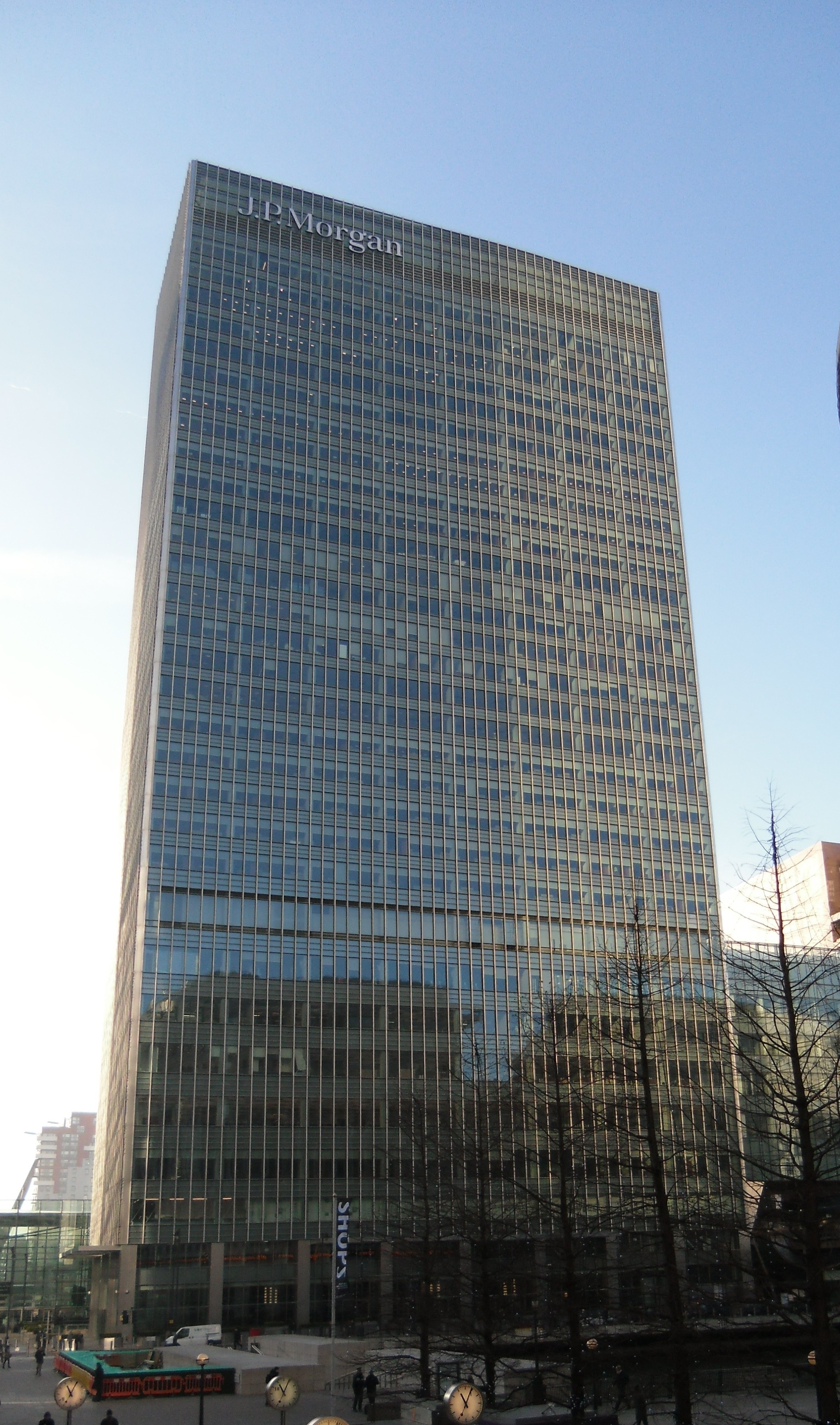
25 Bank Street in London

During December 2010 an announcement was made that the previous headquarters of Lehman Brothers at 25 Bank Street in Canary Wharf would be purchased to function as the company's European head office.

In April 2026, JP Morgan Chase has reached agreement with London City airport to build one of Europe’s tallest office towers in the east of the capital, to serve as its new headquarters.

The new £3 billion London headquarters tower in the Canary Wharf financial district is expected to span 279,000 sq metres (3 million sq ft) and will house more than half of its 23,000 UK staff.

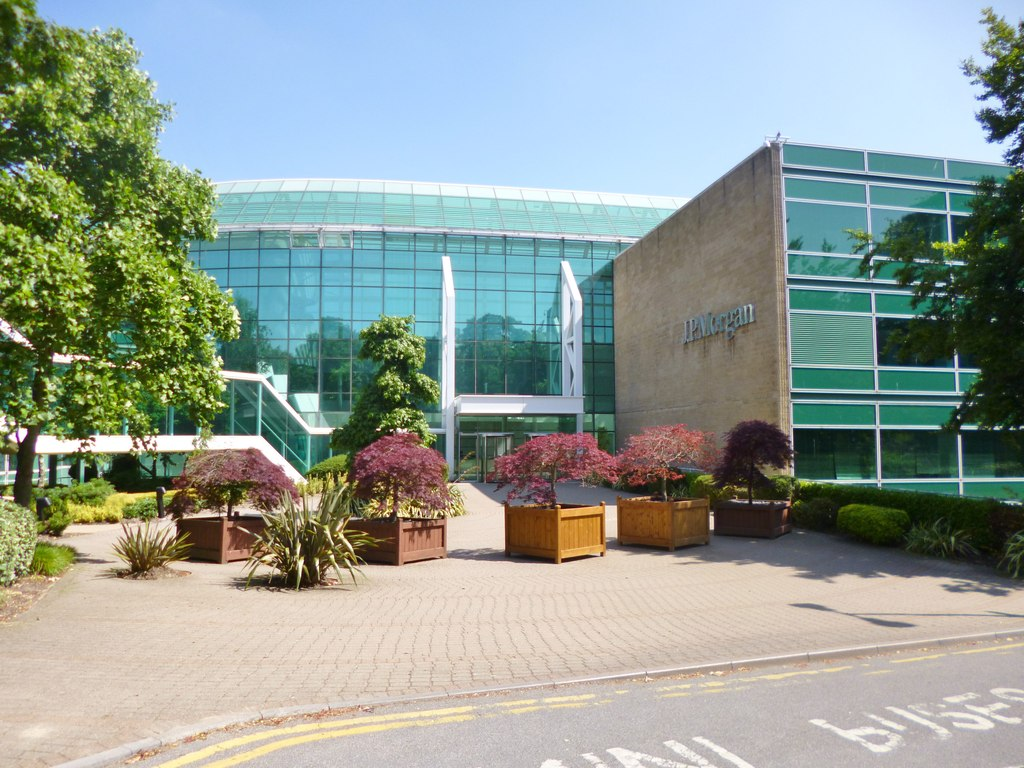
J.P. Morgan offices in Littledown, Bournemouth

== Commercial and investment banking services ==
=== Asset Management ===
J.P. Morgan Asset Management provides investment solutions to financial institutions, sovereigns, intermediaries and private individuals. It is based in London.

=== Global Corporate Bank ===
Provides corporate banking services to large corporations, financial institutions and public sector organizations. Services include financing, risk management, working capital, cash management and investments.

=== Investment Bank ===
The investment bank is one of the largest in the United Kingdom. It offers banking services including M&A advisory, corporate banking, debt capital markets, capital raising and risk management.

==== J.P. Morgan Cazenove ====
J.P. Morgan Cazenove became a wholly owned part of J.P. Morgan in 2010, having originally operated as a joint venture between J.P. Morgan and the UK investment bank Cazenove. Its three core businesses are corporate finance, cash equities and equity research. It is based in London. J.P Morgan Cazenove is a trading name of J.P. Morgan Securities plc.

=== Private Banking ===
A franchise that provides wealth management services to ultra-high-net-worth individuals and families.

=== Treasury & Securities Services ===
Made up of two divisions, Treasury and Worldwide Securities Services. Treasury Services provides cash management products, trade finance and logistics solutions, wholesale card products, and short-term liquidity management capabilities to small and mid-sized companies, multinational corporations, financial institutions and government entities while Worldwide Securities Services stores, values, clears and services securities and alternative investments for investors and broker-dealers.

== Retail banking ==
=== Post office card account contract ===
J.P. Morgan Europe Ltd provided the banking licence and the electronic benefits transfer banking engine for the Post Office card account, from 24 January 2006 until 1 December 2022, having taken over from the previous provider Citibank. The deal of exchange of services was valued at $380,000,000. New applications for a Post Office card account were closed on 11 May 2020.

The Post Office Card Account (POca) is a cash handling account allowing customers to receive benefit payments. The Card Account cannot be accessed anywhere other than a Post Office Counter or ATM at a post office branch. These accounts can only receive issuances of the DWP benefit payments and HMRC Tax Credits and Child Benefit payments. To open an account, you must be in receipt of benefits and a referral is made via Jobcentre Plus.

J.P. Morgan closed all Post Office card accounts on 1 December 2022.

=== Chase UK ===
J.P. Morgan Europe Ltd has operated Chase UK inside the United Kingdom since 2021.

== Banking errors ==
=== November 2002-July 2009 ===
The bank was fined £33,320,000 for failing to protect the money of the clientele of the bank during November 2002 and July 2009. The lack of due consideration was given as resulting from error, and elsewhere as caused by the efforts of ring-fencing.

=== April 2012 ===
A senior executive of the bank resigned in April 2012 having been found to have committed a civil crime amounting to market abuse, as defined by the FSA.

=== May 2012 ===
The chief officer and others having made errors during May 2012, causing losses to the bank amounting to £1.2 billion, were expected to resign. At the time of the report JP Morgan was stated as considering the closure of the London investment unit.
