= Kroo (bank) =

British online bank

Kroo Bank Ltd
- Type: Private company
- Industry: Financial services
- Founded: 2016; 10 years ago
- Founders: Nazim Valimahomed
- Headquarters: London, United Kingdom
- Area served: United Kingdom
- Products: Banking services
- Services: Retail banking
- Total assets: 873.918M
- Number of employees: 223
- Website: kroo.com

Kroo Bank Ltd is a British neobank based in London. It provides its retail banking services via a mobile app.

== History ==
Kroo Bank was founded in 2016 by Nazim Valimahomed as B-Social, offering an app based debit Mastercard issued by Wirecard Card Solutions Ltd. Valimahomed founded the bank after previously selling an ad company to French advertising conglomerate Publicis and becoming disenchanted with the UK's "terrible" banking system. Prior to founding the bank, Valimahomed fled Uganda, then under the control of military dictator Idi Amin, as child refugee, before eventually making his way to the UK.

B-Social Ltd rebranded as Kroo in 2020 and was granted a full banking licence by the Bank of England in 2022, one of only four banks to be granted a new licence since 2013.

In 2021, chief risk officer Andrea De Gottardo became CEO of Kroo. In November 2023, Kroo started a crowdfunding, using platform Crowdcube, that raised £1 million in its first few hours and £9.5 million by the end of the campaign. In November 2024, Kroo reached £1 billion in deposits.

In July 2026, Kroo entered into a forward-flow funding arrangement with specialist lender 9Y Capital. Under the agreement, Kroo would fund a portion of 9Y Capital's future bridging and refurbishment loan originations.

In 2026 Veronika Lovett became CEO, and in May 2026, Kroo entered into a partnership with specialist bridging lender Glenhawk, acquiring a portfolio of Glenhawk's existing loans and agreeing to fund a portion of its future UK bridge loan originations through a forward flow arrangement.

== Services ==
Kroo is a digital bank with a mobile app, and no branches. Kroo offers interest on all accounts. As of July 2025, Kroo Bank offers current accounts, savings accounts, a cash ISA and personal loans.

== See also ==
- List of banks in the United Kingdom
