= Mergers in United Kingdom law =

Mergers in United Kingdom law is a theory-based regulation that helps forecast and avoid abuse, while indirectly maintaining a competitive framework within the market. A true merger is one in which two separate entities merge into an entirely new entity. In Law the term ‘merger’ has a much broader application, for example where A acquires all, or a majority of, the shares in B, and is able to control the affairs of B as such.

== Regulatory Bodies ==
The Office of Fair Trading (OFT) and Competition Commission (CC) were responsible for enforcing Competition Law within the UK, however the Competition and Markets Authority (CMA) took over the competition and some consumer functions of the Office of Fair Trading (OFT) as well as the Competition Commission (CC) on 1 April 2014, at which time the OFT and CC were abolished. The CMA conducts both the initial Phase 1 examination of mergers and the more detailed Phase 2 investigation and final determination. Certain CMA decisions can be appealed to the Competition Appeal Tribunal (CAT).

UK merger control is governed by the Enterprise Act 2002, as amended by the Enterprise and Regulatory Reform Act 2013 (ERRA). The ERRA came into force on 1 April 2014.

=== EU Law ===
Article 102 under competition law is designed to prevent market abuse. In 2003, merger control was enacted to prevent anti-competitive actions. Article 102 prohibits undertakings that individually or collectively hold a dominant position within the EU or a substantial part of it from abusing their dominance without objective justification insofar as it may affect trade between member states. Article 102 TFEU is mirrored in the national competition laws of the United Kingdom as well as of the other member states. The UK's Chapter II Competition Act 1998 Prohibitions also deals with the abuse of a dominant position by a firm.

The term under EC law for merger is "concentration", which exists when a...

"change of control on a lasting basis results from (a) the merger of two or more previously independent undertakings... (b) the acquisition... if direct or indirect control of the whole or parts of one or more other undertakings." Art. 3(1), Regulation 139/2004, the European Community Merger Regulation

This usually means that one firm buys out the shares of another. The reasons for oversight of economic concentrations by the state are the same as the reasons to restrict firms who abuse a position of dominance, only that regulation of mergers and acquisitions attempts to deal with the problem before it arises, ex ante prevention of creating dominant firms. In the case of [T-102/96] Gencor Ltd v. Commission [1999] ECR II-753 the EU Court of First Instance wrote merger control is there "to avoid the establishment of market structures which may create or strengthen a dominant position and not need to control directly possible abuses of dominant positions".

=== Exemptions ===
The exceptions to the CMA's duty to refer. The CMA may decide not to refer a merger for a Phase two investigation if they had a genuine reason to believe that; the market concerned is of insufficient importance to justify a reference i.e. the De Minimis exception, this exception may only be available where the affected markets are worth less than £10m in aggregate. The CMA may also make an exception to their duty to refer, if there are any relevant consumer benefits arising out of the merger and that these benefits would outweigh the substantial lessening of competition. The CMA may also make an exception to their duty to refer in the case of anticipated mergers, this is when the arrangements concerned are insufficiently far advanced, or insufficiently likely to proceed. Another exception which the CMA may consider, might be the merger or acquisition of a firm which is inevitably going to fail or become insolvent, and taking it over would not have a significant impact on competition as that was bound to happen regardless of whether the merger took place.

== Merger types ==
=== Horizontal ===
A horizontal merger takes place when two or more competitors merge into one, or one of it directly or indirectly controls another undertaking as a whole when they are operating in the same product and geographic market. For example, Glaxo Wellcome and SmithKline Beecham merged to become GlaxoSmithKline in 2000. is a typical example of horizontal merger in that they operate in the same markets. Horizontal mergers have two kinds of effects: unilateral and coordinated. The unilateral effect arises as the competition between the merging companies is eliminated. The subsequent increase in marketing power may harm consumers through higher prices and/or reduced product diversity.The coordinated effect occurs when a market condition such as product homogeneity allows the merged entity to behave in an anti-competitive way such as price raising.

=== Vertical ===
A vertical merger takes place when two or more businesses that operate at different levels merge. Such a merger leads to 'double marginalisation', resulting in more profit for the organisation if, e.g., material cost is reduced substantially or production processes are improved. Vertical integration may be backwards or forward, and may lead to a foreclosure of the upmarket if the upstream firm has a near monopoly over e.g. raw material. An example of vertical integration, is that of Apple, who control the manufacturing as well as distribution of their products.

=== Conglomerate ===
A conglomerate merger arises when merger partners generally operate in separate markets. In cases where the merger results in smaller product lines, e.g., to remove overlaps, reducing consumer choice. Conglomerate mergers may occur for a few reasons i.e. increasing market share or perhaps merging to reduce the risk of loss through diversification; Tata Group is one of the world's most diversified businesses and a great example of a conglomerate.

== Substantive test ==
The New Merger Regulation was enacted by the European Commission in May 2004. The regulation reformulated the "substantive test", which closes a loophole in the old test. The Substantive test, is a test for whether a merger has resulted or may be expected to result in a substantial lessening of competition (SLC).

The leading case was Airtours v Commission. After Airtours plc and First Choice Holidays plc merged, the commission argued that due to a unique holiday package selling in the UK market, 'collective dominant position' was gained by Airtours, since it was selling a high number of the holiday package. The Commission thereby blocked the (hostile) merger. This revealed the need for an updated substantive test. The new substantive test, also termed a 'dominance test'. The new substantive test assesses the extent to which the merger decreases competition. It was the case of Airtours v Commission in 2002 which ultimately urged the commission to recommend a change in the EU merger regulation. Initially the commission prohibited the merger between Airtours and First Choice on the basis that together they would create a collective dominant position in the market, and may have created an incentive for the remaining firms in the oligopolistic market to change their behaviour and restrict market capacity. ." The Commission believed it was "sufficient that the merger makes it rational for the oligopolists...to act individually in ways which will substantially reduce competition between them." The decision to prohibit the merger made by the commission was annulled by the Court of First Instance, the Court recalled that if a concentration is to be prohibited, it must have had the direct and immediate effect of creating or strengthening a collective dominant position significantly and lastingly impeding effective competition in the market, the CFI found that the commission had not been able to successfully prove that the concentration would have created a collective dominant position capable of restricting competition in the United Kingdom short-haul package holiday market. The case created a significant level of uncertainty in EU merger law as there was a perceived gap in the law- the gap of the non-collusive oligopoly. It was in response to the concerns raised regarding the “dominance test” and the non-collusive oligopoly gap in EU merger regulation, and as such the European Council adopted regulation 139/2004. Richard Whish described the EUMR of 2004 as "disarmingly simple" in that the 'dominance test' remains but the question posed by the test is reversed. The new test is known as the 'SIEC' (significant impediment to effective competition) test.

=== Brexit ===
The United Kingdom is inevitably set to leave the European Union by the end of 2020. The effect of Brexit is vastly unclear especially considering the uncertainty behind Brexit itself, as is the opinion of Andrea Coscelli, the acting chief of the CMA. The extent of the implications that Brexit will have, is dependent on whether there is a withdrawal agreement or a no-deal Brexit. A potential withdrawal agreement would provide the CMA with a transition period in which EUMR cases would be reviewed by both the European Commission and the UK, until the period comes to an end. In the case of a no-deal Brexit, this would amount to a complete separation between the EU and the UK, as such the CMA would have to exercise its affairs independently from the day the UK leaves the EU. After withdrawing from the EU, the UK will no longer be obliged to interpret national law in accordance with EU law and companies may have to comply with divergent systems.
