= Chase UK =

Online bank brand

Chase
- Type: Division
- Industry: Financial services
- Founded: 2021
- Headquarters: 25 Bank Street, London, United Kingdom
- Key people: Kuba Fast (CEO)
- Services: Retail banking
- Revenue: ▼£1,151.0 million (2025)
- Operating income: ▲£158.9 million (2025)
- Net income: ▲£114.2 million (2025)
- Total assets: ▲£29,435.9 million (2025)
- Total equity: ▲£2,593.9 million (2025)
- Owner: JPMorgan Chase
- Number of employees: ▲1,000
- Parent: J.P. Morgan Europe Limited
- Website: chase.co.uk

Chase is a British-based online bank brand operating as a division of J.P. Morgan Europe Limited. As of December 2025, Chase reported having more than 2.5 million customers and customer deposits exceeding £26 billion.

== History ==
In January 2021, JPMorgan Chase announced that it was to enter the British retail banking sector, under the Chase brand, later that year, establishing its first non-American retail banking operation in its history. The first Chase branded products in the UK were launched in September 2021.

It was named the fastest-growing fintech app in 2022, beating the likes of Starling and Monzo. In May 2023, Chase announced it had attracted over 1.6 million customers since it launched in the UK, and held £15 billion in customer deposits.

In September 2023, Chase announced it would ban all cryptocurrency purchases made from 16 October 2023.

== Services ==
The Chase current account was launched in September 2021. The account allows customers to send and receive money via Faster Payments and since March 2022, the option to pay by direct debits. Chase plans to launch further products in the next three to four years including, savings, investment accounts, personal lending and mortgages. A savings account was launched in March 2022 and a credit card in November 2024.

== See also ==
- List of banks in the United Kingdom
