= Oxford Entrepreneurs =

Student society

- Formation: 2002; 24 years ago
- Type: Private
- Headquarters: Oxford, England
- Affiliations: University of Oxford
- Website: oxfordentrepreneurs.co.uk

Oxford Entrepreneurs is an Oxford-based British student society which was founded in 2002 to encourage entrepreneurship among students at University of Oxford. It is the largest entrepreneurship society in Europe. Its alumni have founded some of Britain's most successful startups, including Monzo, GoCardless, Onfido, Quid, and PlinkArt (acquired by Google).

== History ==
Oxford Entrepreneurs was founded in 2002. It supports entrepreneurs at the University of Oxford by running events and assisting with the development of ideas.

== Companies founded by its members ==
Companies founded by Oxford Entrepreneurs alumni include Auctomatic (founded by Kulveer Taggar and Harjeet Taggar, acquired by Live Current Media), Quid (founded by Bob Goodson), GroupSpaces (founded by David Langer and Andy Young), Oxford BioLabs (founded by Thomas Whitfield), Onfido (founded by Husayn Kassai and Eamon Jubbawy), GoCardless (founded by Hiroki Takeuchi, Tom Blomfield and Matt Robinson).
