= Tom Blomfield =

British entrepreneur (born 1985)

Tom Blomfield OBE
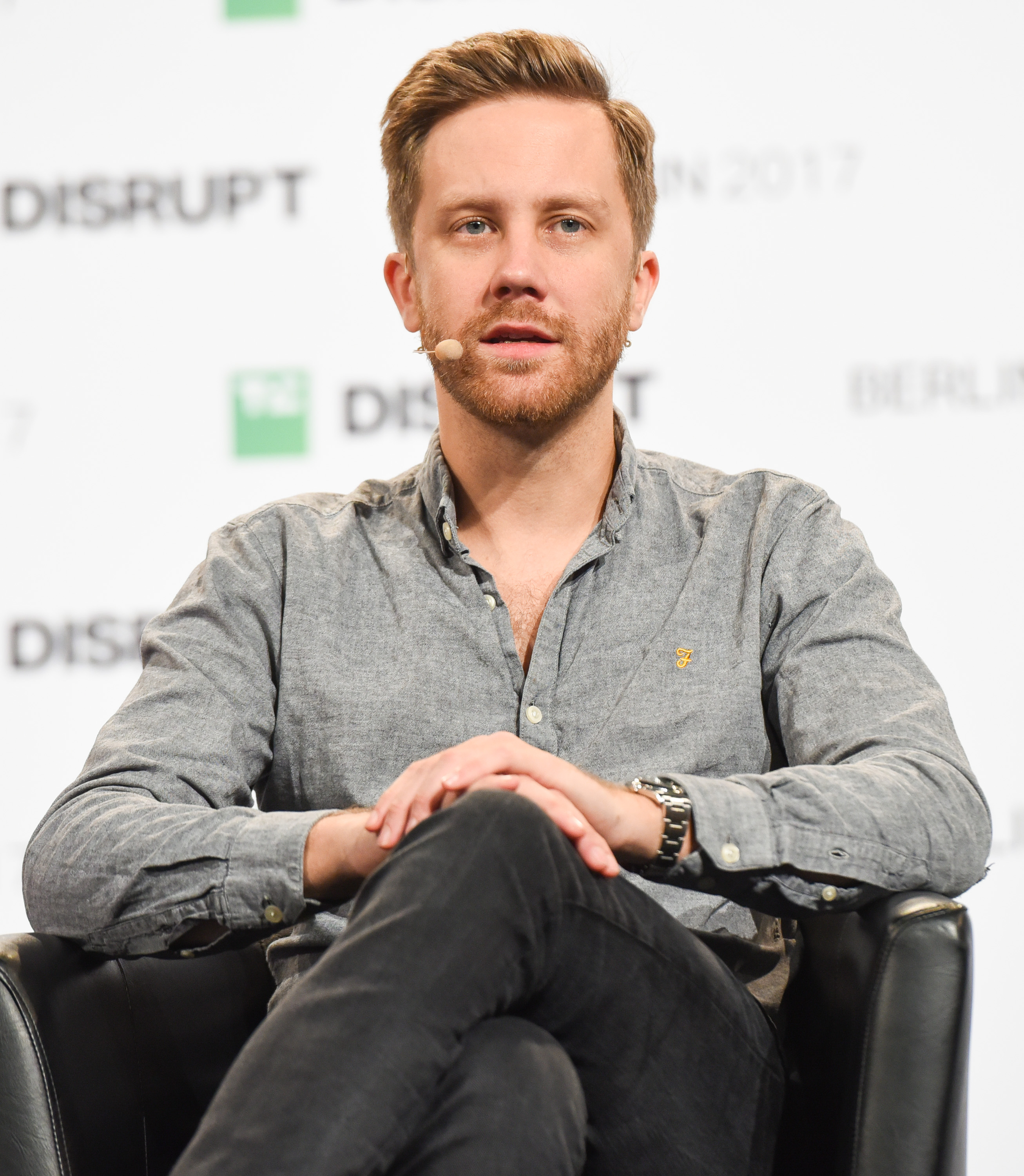
- Born: Thomas Benjamin Blomfield; 11 August 1985 (age 41); Hong Kong
- Education: University of Oxford; Panthéon-Assas University
- Occupation: President of Monzo Bank (left January 2021)

Thomas Benjamin Blomfield OBE (born 11 August 1985) is a British entrepreneur and a group partner at Y Combinator.

== Early life ==
Blomfield grew up in Buckinghamshire and attended Dr Challoner's Grammar School in Amersham. His first business was building a website for a local estate agent, whom Blomfield charged £250 for the webpage and £3 per house to be added upon receiving instructions.

He earned a degree in law (jurisprudence) from the University of Oxford. He completed an exchange at Paris-Panthéon-Assas University in Paris to study French and European law.

== Career ==
While at Oxford, he received a £1,000 prize from a business plan competition organised by Oxford Entrepreneurs, proposing an "eBay for students" in 2004. Named Boso.com, it expanded to 50 universities across the UK, and Blomfield ran the company from 2004 until 2006. He told a reporter that the business struggled to raise money due to difficulties connecting with investors. Blomfield's two partners in the business went to Silicon Valley and went on the Y Combinator programme, however he did not attend due to university examinations. The business was sold to a Canadian company for "several million dollars" upon which it was remade into Auctomatic, a power selling tool for eBay users.

Blomfield then studied at Université Panthéon-Assas (Paris II) from 2005 to 2006, and returned to Oxford to study for a master's degree in Law from 2007 to 2008. He decided after a few internships with law firms that he did not want to become a lawyer.

Upon leaving Oxford, he first worked as an associate consultant at OC&C Strategy Consultants, working on "dog and cat food, baby car seats, frozen pizzas, debt collection, and one company that refurbished passenger airlines, plus a few pub chains".

=== GoCardless ===
Blomfield co-founded the UK-based company GoCardless in January 2011 with Hiroki Takeuchi and Matt Robinson. The company rose to prominence after receiving a £125,000 investment from Y Combinator. Blomfield stayed in Silicon Valley and during his three years at the company, it raised around £35 million of investment and hired 100 people. When GoCardless formally appointed Hiroki Takeuchi as CEO in 2013, he left (keeping a "very small share" in the £50-100m valued company) and moved to New York to work for dating site Grouper social club as their Head of Growth. Blomfield left Grouper in 2014, and it closed in 2016.

=== Starling Bank ===
Blomfield first met former Allied Irish Banks and Royal Bank of Scotland banker Anne Boden around 2011, where the two reportedly discussed the idea of digital banking. However Blomfield was at first "reluctant" and "suspicious" of Boden's traditional banking connections.

On his return from Grouper in New York, Blomfield joined Boden at her company Starling Bank which was at that point one of the first digital banking companies. He departed in early 2015 after reports of disagreements at Starling, telling the Financial Times that "he could not comment under the terms of his departure".

=== Monzo ===
In 2015, he founded challenger bank Monzo. In its first fundraising round, the company raised "£1 million in 96 seconds". As of 2019 the company was built on the "lean start up concept", operating with no branches and instead offering accounts online which cost the company "about £20 to £30 to provide".

In January 2020 his fellow founder, Paul Rippon, departed the company to spend time farming alpacas. In April, Blomfield announced he would forgo his salary for one year to help his company during the COVID-19 pandemic. In May, he announced that he was stepping down as CEO of Monzo and taking on the role of president of the company. In January 2021 he announced he was leaving the company permanently.

=== Recipe Ninja ===
In March 2025 Blomfield launched Recipe Ninja, an AI recipe generation app created by "vibe coding." The app received media attention for generating recipes such as "Cyanide Ice Cream," "Thick White Cum Soup," and "Uranium Bomb."

== Personal life ==
Blomfield was born in Hong Kong. His father was an entrepreneur, having set up an engineering company in his mid-30s. Blomfield spent his childhood learning programming languages, playing sport, and singing, though he was rejected by his school choir for being tone deaf and insensitive.

He spends his free time making pottery, and has travelled to east Africa including Kenya, Uganda, Rwanda and Zanzibar. He has been critical of the Silicon Valley business environment, calling it a "dystopia" due to its "wealth inequality and the lack of provision for homelessness and mental health".

He has also frequently criticised British culture for making it harder for entrepreneurs to succeed here. Blomfield said the British “know your place, don’t get too big for your boots” attitude stifles innovation.

== Awards and recognition ==
In 2013, he was recognised as one of the top five entrepreneurs under 30 by the European Commission.

He was appointed an Officer of the Order of the British Empire (OBE) in the 2019 New Year Honours for services to Improving Competition and Financial Inclusion in the Banking Sector.
