= Anne Boden =

British entrepreneur (b. 1960)

Anne Elizabeth Boden MBE
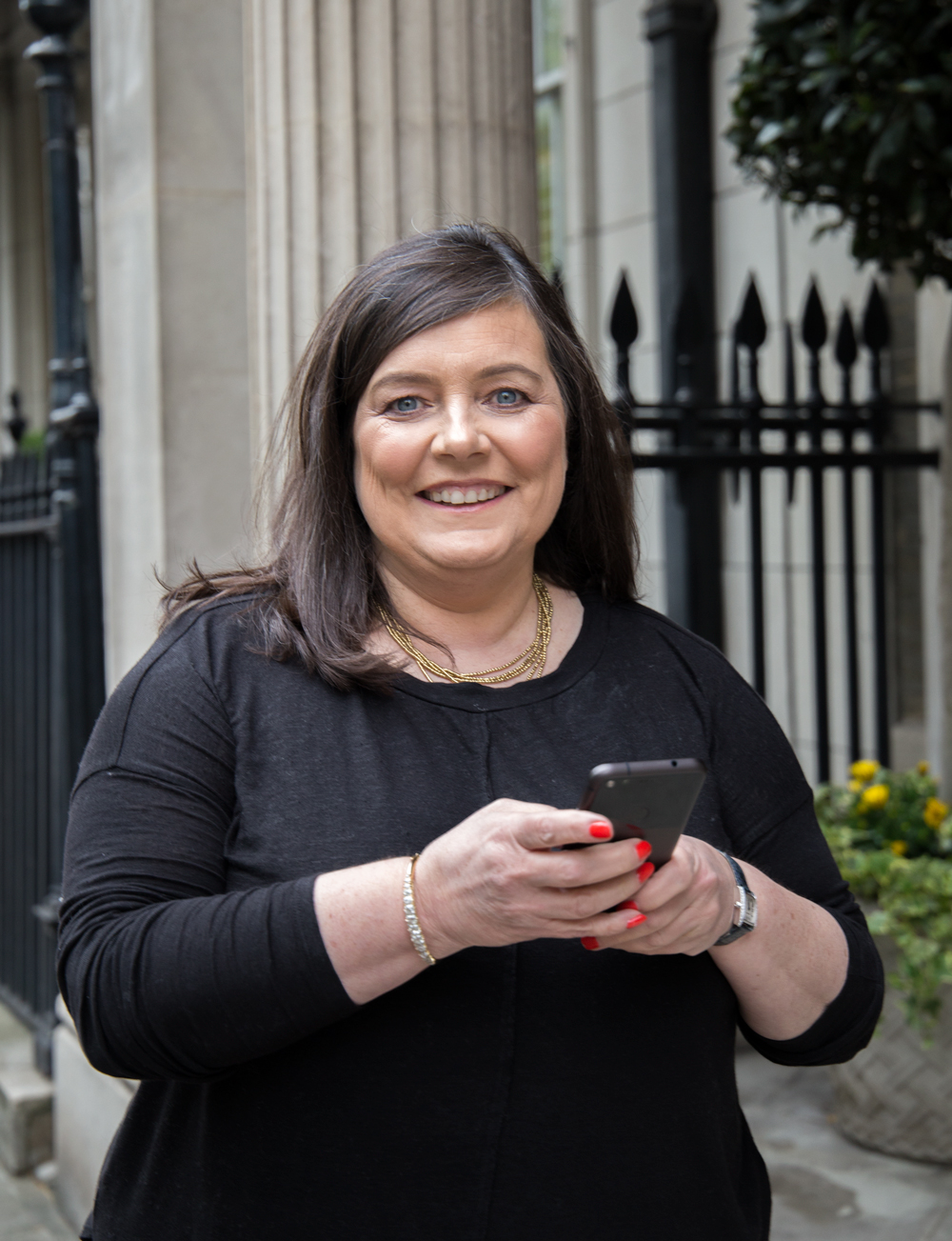
- Born: January 1960 (age 66); Swansea, Wales
- Education: Swansea University; Middlesex University
- Occupations: Former CEO and founder of Starling Bank

3 minute Welsh Government video of Anne Boden introducing herself and Starling Bank; July 2020.

Anne Elizabeth Boden MBE (born January 1960) is a Welsh tech entrepreneur. She is the founder and former CEO of Starling Bank and the first woman to found a British bank. In 2018, she received an MBE for services to financial technology.

== Early life ==
Boden was born in Bon-y-maen a suburb of Swansea, the daughter of a steelworker and a department store worker. She attended Cefn Hengoed Comprehensive and graduated from Swansea University in 1981 with a degree in Chemistry and Computer Sciences. Boden reportedly spent much of her childhood reading. After the financial crisis, Boden sold her house in Swansea where she spent her weekends, in order to raise funds and hire staff at her company.

== Career ==
After graduating, Boden had intended to pursue a career in information technology, but accepted a job as a graduate trainee with Lloyds Banking Group. She went on to work at Standard Chartered, UBS, and as Chief Information Officer at Aon. Boden later joined ABN AMRO and Royal Bank of Scotland Group, serving as Head of EMEA and as head of Global Transaction Banking. At the group, she ran a payments business across 34 countries. Boden earned her MBA from Middlesex University in 1990 while working for Standard Chartered.

In 2011, she served on the Board of Governors of Middlesex University, which awarded her an honorary doctorate degree in July 2018.

She joined Allied Irish Banks in 2012 as Chief Operating Officer to help the bank recover from the 2008 financial crisis.

=== Starling Bank ===
Boden founded Starling Bank in June 2014, originally named Possible Financial Services, with the tagline "Bank Possible". Her objective was to create an entirely on-line bank that gave easier feedback to customers.

In February 2015, co-founder and CTO Tom Blomfield, departed Starling to found the bank Monzo. The other four directors left with him.

The company rebranded as Starling Bank in January 2016 and received its banking licence in the UK that year. The Telegraph described the company as "the Amazon of banking" after it received multiple investments from Austrian-born billionaire Harald McPike.

Boden lost her position as majority shareholder in the bank in July 2019 after a large investment from McPike during a series C funding round in February. McPike has to date invested £75 million (for a 60% stake) in the company, followed by a £50 million share held by Merian Global Investors. As of July 2019, the company had raised £233 million of investment. Boden is a member of Tech Nation's FinTech Delivery Panel and has spoken at industry events such as Money20/20 and Wealth 2.0.

In June 2023, Boden stepped down as Starling CEO after investor clash but retained her 4.9 per cent ownership of Starling.

In July 2024, Boden stepped down from Starling's board, pivoting away from the company to focus on developing a new artificial intelligence business, AI By Boden.

=== Other Professional Achievements ===
Boden is the chair of the government's 'Women-led High-Growth Enterprise Taskforce'.

In 2020, Boden became a member of the board of the trade association for the UK's banks and financial services companies, UK Finance, and also an advisor to the UK government's Board of Trade. She is also a member of the World Economic Forum.

In 2020, Boden published the book Banking On It: How I Disrupted an Industry. Her second book, Female Founders' Playbook - Insights from the Superwomen Who Have Made It, was released in 2024.

== Awards ==
Starling's Anne Boden named CEO of the year at the Digital Masters Awards in 2020.

In July 2023, Boden was awarded an honorary doctorate by Swansea University, from which she had earned her bachelor's degree.
