= Grouper (disambiguation) =

A grouper is a type of fish.

Grouper may also refer to:

- Grouper social club, a smartphone app between 2011 and 2016 that matched sets of three friends on group dates
- In Australia, 'Groupers' was an informal term for members of the Industrial Groups
- Grouper (musician), American musician
- Grouper, the former name of Crackle (streaming service)
