= Link Ethiopia =

Ethiopian non-profit international organization

- Founded: 1996; 30 years ago
- Type: International organization
- Purpose: Education
- Location(s): London, Gondar and Bishoftu
- Region served: Ethiopia
- Website: www.linkethiopia.org

Link Ethiopia is an Ethiopian non-profit international organization that focuses on education. Link Ethiopia was started as GondarLink in 1996, and was originally a single link between Dr Challoner's Grammar School in Amersham, UK and Fasiledes Comprehensive Secondary School in Gondar, Ethiopia. Since then it has grown, not only to manage links between 110 schools in the UK and 80 in Ethiopia, but to include a child sponsorship programme, volunteer teaching scheme and infrastructure, resourcing and training projects in schools in Ethiopia. Link Ethiopia now benefits around 100,000 children in Ethiopia through school linking and projects and 30,000 in the UK through cultural exchange programmes.

== History ==
GondarLink was set up in 1996 by Chris Grant, a teacher at Dr Challoner's Grammar School in Amersham. After a visit to Ethiopia Chris linked Dr Challoner's with Fasiledes Comprehensive Secondary School in Gondar, Ethiopia's third largest town. The link allowed students at Dr Challoner's to support Fasiledes to improve the educational resources available to them through fundraising efforts at the school as well as providing a base for cultural exchanges between the students keen to find out what life was like in their linked schools countries. In 1996 Chris Grant took a group of Dr Challoner's students to Ethiopia to visit Fasiledes, enabling a more direct cultural exchange, a tradition which continued for many years.

GondarLink remained a single school link until 2003 when requests from elementary schools in Ethiopia to also be linked to UK schools prompted it to expand. The first of these links was formed between Brushwood School, Chesham and Meseret Elementary School, Gondar in June 2003. From 2003 the number of school links grew, with 135 schools in the UK and 2 in the US currently linked with 80 schools across Ethiopia. To reflect this shift from a regional focus in Gondar to the development of links across Ethiopia, GondarLink changed its name in 2005 to Link Ethiopia.

== School linking ==
School linking has remained one of Link Ethiopia's primary focuses in its work. The links enable young people in the UK, US and Ethiopia to work together and learn about each other and each other's cultures. Schools take part in a number of different activities including shared learning activities, where students in each country take part in the same activities and share their experiences afterwards, and letter writing between schools which encourages students to ask their own questions about their linked school's culture.

Link Ethiopia's school links programme has been praised by a number of organisations including Think Global: The Development Education Association and the BBC, who made Link Ethiopia a partner in their "World Class" programme.
