= YouNoodle =

Company based in San Francisco

YouNoodle, Inc.
- Founded: 2010
- Founder: Rebeca Hwang; Torsten Kolind
- Headquarters: San Francisco
- Key people: Bob Goodson; Kirill Makharinsky
- Website: www.younoodle.com

YouNoodle, Inc. is a San Francisco-based company, with offices in Barcelona and Santiago, founded in 2010, building a platform for entrepreneurship competitions all over the world. YouNoodle matches entrepreneurs with competitions, accelerators, and startup programs, and provides a judging and voting SaaS platform to university, non-profit, government and enterprise clients organizing innovation challenges and competitions. Stanford's BASES, UC Berkeley LAUNCH, Start-Up Chile, Amazon Startup Challenge, and NASA are all running one or more competitions on YouNoodle's platform.

== History and structure ==
YouNoodle was founded by Rebeca Hwang and Torsten Kolind in 2010. The company was spun off a project started by Bob Goodson (Quid) and Kirill Makharinsky (Enki) in 2007 with support from Peter Thiel (Founders Fund), Max Levchin (PayPal) and Charles Lho (Amicus Group), founding investor and Chairman of YouNoodle today. This project also spawned Quid (Goodson) and indirectly Ostrovok (Makharinsky). Although also named YouNoodle, this project/company was discontinued in 2010, when the three new entities started operations.

The founders of the 2007-2010 entity were Goodson and Makharinsky, both former students of the University of Oxford. Goodson had studied medieval English literature before moving from Oxford to California when Levchin, the co-founder of PayPal, invited him to join a start-up there. Makharinsky's degree was in applied mathematics, and he was also encouraged to pursue opportunities in the United States by Levchin. Other significant employees included Hwang (co-founder of today's YouNoodle), a Stanford University doctoral student whose research is into social network theory.

== Startup predictor ==
YouNoodle's now discontinued "Startup predictor", part of the 2007-2010 entity and developed by Makharinsky and Hwang, used mathematical models to predict the success of new businesses. The user fills in a questionnaire, which takes about half an hour to complete and concentrates on the business concept, finances, founders and advisers. Because the procedure was designed for new companies, questions on revenue and traffic are not included. The site then provided an estimate of what the company's value will be after three years and a score from 1 to 1000 representing its value as an investment. The service was free for the startups themselves, but YouNoodle intended to charge third parties for access to the results. The level of detail required by the questionnaire makes it difficult for people without inside knowledge of a company to provide the data for a prediction on their own.

The company's founders have declined to explain the algorithm in detail, but state that it takes into account the entrepreneurs' experience, networks and mutual relations. Information provided by companies which use the site's networking features is used to improve the algorithm. As of August 2008, the algorithm was based on data from 3,000 startups. In the same month the company had four patents pending on the technology.
