= Diversity debt =

Diversity debt refers to an initially skewed organizational demographic composition that endures through growth and demands costly engagement with diversity at scale. The term was coined in the first half of the 2010s, and leveraged by companies as one metric contributing to gender pay gap analyses. UK-based bank Monzo were the first to publicise this widely; their case has been cited in evaluations of the metric and its accompanying philosophy..

== Theory ==
As with any debt (such as financial debt), diversity debt is first incurred at the founding or incorporation of an organization such as a company or firm. It is based on how statistically unrepresentative the company may be, of some sample population (typically the population of the country in which the company is first established) and fluctuates with incremental changes in the workforce:

- Hiring a member of some under-represented minority population (e.g., with regard to gender and/or ethnicity) will tend to decrease ("pay off") the debt.
- Hiring more members of any already-over-represented majority will tend to increase the debt.
- Diversity debt also has self-reinforcing properties whereby existing underrepresentation deters members of underrepresented groups from entering the candidate pool, exacerbating diversity debt in a vicious cycle.

For example, a company established by 2 co-founders of the same gender and ethnicity automatically starts with some diversity debt since no country is entirely uniform in gender and ethnicity; at the hiring of a 3rd team member, diversity debt can be used as one metric to determine the impact of the hire upon the diversity represented in the workforce. Moreover, such diversity debt may then become a negative signal for job seekers who will factor the company's track record in hiring underrepresented members into their expectations of encountering bias or discrimination.

The metric is open to controversial interpretation and application in many jurisdictions where the consideration of a candidate's gender and/or race is explicitly outlawed. For example, in the United States, some affirmative action policies are encouraged, but others are penalised in federal law.

== In popular culture ==
Sarah Saska delivered a TEDx talk on the topic in 2017. Monzo has stopped using the term in its public discussions around diversity and inclusion.
