= Robert Chaloner =

Robert Chaloner may refer to:

- Robert Chaloner (priest) (died 1621), Canon of Windsor
- Robert Chaloner (MP) (1776–1842), English Member of Parliament and Lord Mayor of York
