= Onfido =

Identity verification software company

- Type: Private
- Industry: Identity verification
- Founded: July 2012; 14 years ago in London, England
- Founders: Husayn Kassai; Eamon Jubbawy; Ruhul Amin
- Headquarters: London, England
- Number of employees: 500
- Parent: Entrust (2024–present)
- Website: onfido.com

Onfido is a technology company that helps businesses verify people's identities using a photo-based identity document, a selfie and artificial intelligence algorithms.

It was founded in July 2012 by three former students at the University of Oxford: Husayn Kassai, Eamon Jubbawy, and Chief Architect Ruhul Amin. Headquartered in London, it has more than 1500 employees working in offices in San Francisco, Albuquerque, New York, Lisbon, Paris, Berlin, Amsterdam, Delhi, Mumbai, Bangalore and Singapore.

== History ==
Husayn Kassai, Eamon Jubbawy, and Ruhul Amin first met when they were students at the University of Oxford. Kassai met Jubbawy when they co-ran the university's Oxford Entrepreneurs society. At one point, the three entered discussions of forming a new company after they had identified the inefficient process of getting identity checks completed in order to secure jobs in the finance industry. Each went through a check that took from 2 to 6 weeks. The idea of Onfido came about to solve the inefficient process of identity checks. They wanted to create a solution that set a new standard by moving away from manual checks to a technological solution based on machine learning. The idea was built with four key aims: to help people gain access to digital services, to protect businesses from fraud, to create a better user experience, and to uphold user privacy. They decided to build a technological solution to the problem and secured seed funding of £20,000 from The University of Oxford's Saïd Business School Seed Fund, launching Onfido in August 2012. The three secured initial deals with around 10 small companies. In January 2013, Onfido secured its first major client, Hassle.com.

In February 2015, Onfido raised $4.5 million from a Series A funding round to help expand the business. By April 2016 it had done almost ten million identity and background checks. The most recent funding round in April 2020 raised $100 million from TPG Growth.

While initially focused on doing identity and background checks for businesses hiring large numbers of permanent staff and contractors, by September 2016 it had shifted its focus to financial services and e-commerce companies. These companies are required to verify the identities of people with whom they do business as part of "Know Your Customer" (KYC) regulations and to help prevent fraud. Onfido helps them to do this without onerous identity verifications. The company also wants to help get people who don't currently have bank accounts into the banking system. Almost 40% of the world's adult population is excluded from opening a bank account, most often due to having thin credit files, or being new migrants without the requisite documents needed for in-person verification and legally required Anti-Money Laundering checks.

On April 9, 2024, Entrust Corporation announced its acquisition of Onfido for $650m in an all-cash deal.

== Service ==
Onfido (pronounced "On-Feed-Oh") helps businesses prove their users’ real identities through its online platform. If a person has a smartphone with a built-in camera, Onfido is able to use it to compare and cross-reference a person's facial biometrics with their identity document, such as a driver's license. The person's identification can then be checked against global databases for any issues. It uses manual and automated machine learning technologies, including optical character recognition and face detection, to verify the passport or ID card of an applicant to prevent fraud. Onfido also conducts right to work, PEP and sanctions checks using multiple data sources.

== Accolades ==
- In 2015, Onfido received an award at the inaugural TechCities Awards in the Thames Valley category.
- 30 Under 30 list of top young leaders across 20 industries.
- Named to the Financial Times' list of the 'Top 100 minority ethnic leaders in technology 2018.'
- Frost & Sullivan 2019 Technology Award
- In 2024, Onfido received the 'Exit of the Year' award from the UK Business Angels Association.

== See also ==
- FIDO Alliance, an industry consortium working on internet authentication mechanisms, including the U2F protocol for two-factor authentication.
