= Harald McPike =

Austrian banker

Harald McPike (born 1958) is a Bahamas-based Austrian billionaire, and a 36% owner of Starling Bank.

He was born in Zürich, Switzerland in 1958. He grew up in Austria, and in the 1980s, studied economics at the University of Vienna.

McPike started his career as a blackjack player. He is the founder of the Bahamas-based quantitative investment manager QuantRes.

McPike has been to the North and South Poles, and wants to go into space. In 2014, he paid a US$7 million deposit to Virginia company Space Adventures towards a lunar orbit for $150 million, and in 2019 after two years of litigation settled with the company.

He is based in The Bahamas. McPike owns the 164-feet hybrid yacht Home, which is estimated to be worth $35 million. He has lived aboard the yacht, and listed it for sale in 2021.

McPike is married to Joann McPike, the founder of Think Global School. They have a son.
