= Dr Challoner's Grammar School =

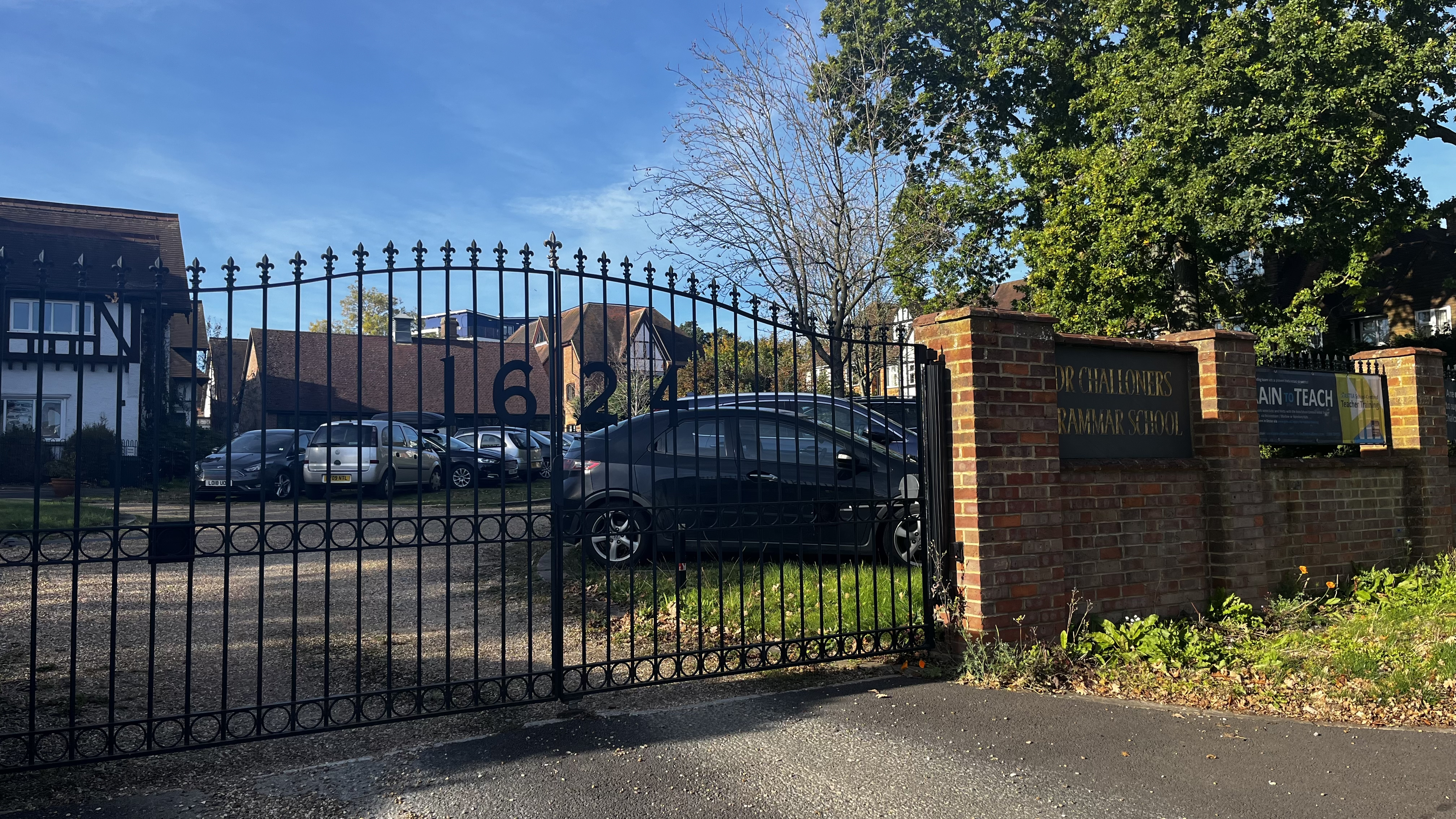
- School badge Dr Challoners Grammar School for Boys entrance

Location
- Chesham Road; Amersham, Buckinghamshire, HP6 5HA; England; 51°40′34″N 0°36′35″W

Information
- Type: Academy Grammar
- Established: 1624; 402 years ago
- Founder: Robert Chaloner
- Local authority: Buckinghamshire
- Specialists: Science; Languages
- Department for Education URN: 136419 Tables
- Ofsted: Reports
- Chair of Governors: Shaun Kennedy
- Headteacher: David Atkinson
- Staff: 150
- Gender: Boys (Year 7–11)
- Age: 11 to 18
- Enrolment: 1,368
- Houses: Foxell; Holman; Newman; Pearson; Rayner; Thorne
- Website: http://www.challoners.com

Dr Challoner's Grammar School (also known as DCGS, Challoner's Boys or simply Challoner's) is an 11–18 boys selective grammar school, with a co-educational Sixth Form, in Amersham, Buckinghamshire, England. It was given academy status in January 2011.

It was founded in 1624 in accordance with the last will and testament of Robert Chaloner. Chaloner, a Doctor of Divinity, who was Rector of Amersham from 1576 to his death in 1621. He was also a Canon of St George's Chapel, Windsor from 1584.

== History ==
=== Early history ===
In his will, Robert Chaloner left money to establish a grammar school in Amersham.

"… the like sume of twenty pounds yearly out of the said lands at Wavendon I give unto my wellbeloved friend Mr. William Tothill Esquire and Mr William Pennyman Esquire to erect a free gramar schoole in Amersam in the County of Bucks to be established by Deede of Feofment or otherwise as their wisdome can devise The towne and p^{ish} allotinge the Churche house for the schoole house or my successor a tenem^{t} in the occupation of Enoch Wyar now or of late for the dwellinge house of the schoole maister whome I will to be chosen by my exequitrix my successor and Mr. Tothill afterwards by my successor and sixe of the eldest Feoffees and cheefest This I leave as a testimony of my loce to them and theire children. Orders for the school—I desire my successor to p^{cure} from the best ordered schooles"

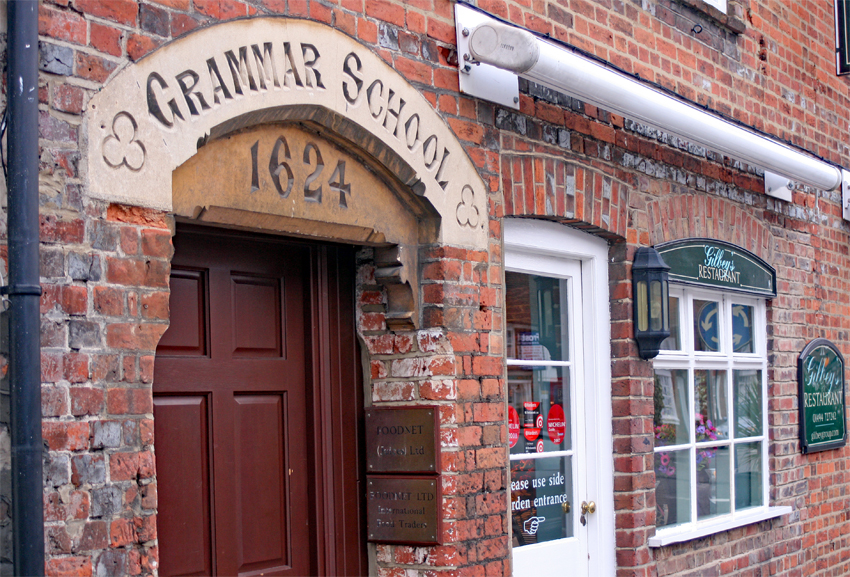
The original school building

The school was situated in Old Amersham for almost three centuries before moving, with the support of Buckinghamshire County Council, to its present position in Amersham-on-the Hill in 1905. At this time, the school embraced the principle of co-education for the first time which, according to the school's first prospectus in 1906, was "practically universal in America". Each year the boys at Challoner's celebrate Founder's Day where they attend St Mary's Church in Old Amersham where Robert Chaloner was rector.

By 1937, Challoner's was incorporated into the state system of education and by the early 1950s, the school had about 350 boys and girls on roll. However, plans for expansion to 550 pupils were overtaken by rapid population growth in the area and the decision was made to establish a separate school for girls, Dr. Challoner's High School, which opened in 1962 in Little Chalfont. The two schools continue to maintain links, collaborating especially in music and drama productions, whilst Dr Challoner's Debating Society has staged collaborative events. Girls were admitted to the boys' school sixth form in 2016.

=== Contemporary ===
The continued expansion of the grammar school to its present size of over 1,350 students saw major building projects in the 1950s, 1980s, and 1990s, followed by the construction of a large astroturf pitch and improvements to the sports fields. Another floor has been added on top of the old library and the new library was reopened in early 2013.

In 2002, Challoner's became one of the first Science Colleges in the United Kingdom. The school started a second special focus as a Language College in April 2007. In 2005, the school celebrated the 100th anniversary of the move to the current site on Chesham Road, also building the Centenary Sports Pitch. The school was commended by the 2007 Ofsted inspection team and rated outstanding in all 51 criteria.

On 1 September 2008, the school officially changed its status from a Voluntary Controlled school to a Foundation school, on the basis that "the additional autonomy which foundation status offers will enabled the school to provide an even better standard of education in the future". In January 2011 the school became an academy.

== Extracurricular ==
=== Robotics ===
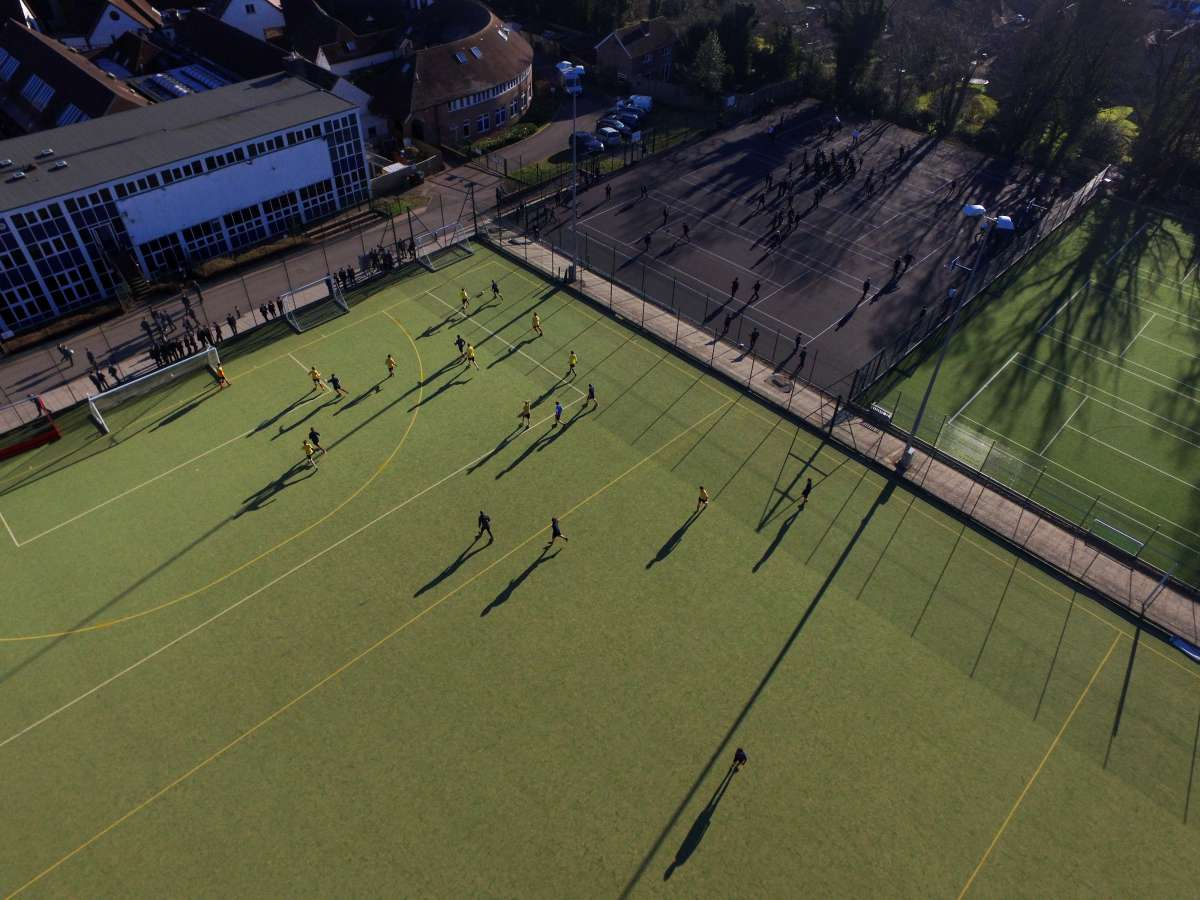
Aerial shot of the DCGS Centenary Sports Pitch

Since the school founded its robotics team in 2015, Challoner's has competed in national and international competitions. In 2017, the school competed in the Student Robotics competition led by University of Southampton and won two awards. In 2018, a team entered into PiWars, a competition involving Raspberry Pi computers hosted at the University of Cambridge. The competition consisted of autonomous and remote controlled challenges with tasks requiring computer vision. The team came out winning the whole competition and having podium finishes on the majority of the challenges.

=== Model United Nations ===
The school has had large amounts of success with its Model United Nations society. Almost entirely student-led, teams have traveled to attend multiple international conferences including HABSMUN and LIMUN. The teams have been successful: at LIMUN 2017 over half of the 16 Year 12 students attending won awards and the Challoner's team won the conference overall. In March 2018 the society competed at SPIMUN (St Petersburg International Model United Nations) where five students won awards. In 2017, the society won the 'We Made a Difference Award' in the 2017 Speaker's Schools Council Awards.

In January 2018, the school hosted its first conference, Challoner's MUN. With over 130 students from 11 schools, the conference was one of the largest student-led activities to have ever been undertaken, having been organized by an executive team of 13 students.

== Houses ==
The house system was re-established in 2004. An earlier house system with four houses named for those listed in the original school song as "Buckinghamshire's four mighty men"—Challoner , Hampden , Milton and Penn —was abandoned in 1976.

There are currently six houses, each named after a previous headmaster:

House	Colour
Foxell	
Holman	
Newman	
Pearson	
Rayner	
Thorne	

The houses compete in a yearly competition, starting with the beginning of the school year in September and culminating at Sports Day, usually in June. The range of activities include sports, drama and music to code-breaking. It also offers a leadership opportunity for students in positions such as Captains, Deputy Captains, and mentors.

== Academics ==
Dr Challoner's students did well in two subjects nationally in 2003. It was one of two schools named by the Department of Education (the other being Royal Grammar School, High Wycombe) as the best performing schools nationwide in the 2003 GCSEs and named the country's best grammar school in 2011. In the 2011 GCSEs, boys achieved a 100% pass rate with 50 of the 183 candidates earning all A*-A grades.

In 2025, the school performed above both the local authority and national average in England for number of pupils obtaining a Grade 5 or above in GCSE level English and Maths. The school also ranked above the local authority and English national average for the number of pupils staying in education, obtaining an apprenticeship or entering employment.

== Notable former pupils ==
Notable former students include:

- Chris Cleave – novelist
- Dame Sandra Dawson – Master of Sidney Sussex College, Cambridge University
- Dominic Goodman – cricketer for Gloucestershire
- Roger Hammond – professional cyclist
- Greg Hands – former Conservative MP for Chelsea & Fulham, Chairman of the Conservative Party and Minister of State for Trade Policy
- Elizabeth Laverick – engineer
- Margaret Mee – botanical artist
- Roger Moore – actor
- John Mousinho – footballer
- Andrew Orr-Ewing – professor of physical chemistry at Bristol University
- Kenneth Page Oakley – anthropologist
- Dominic Raab – former Conservative MP for Esher & Walton, Lord Chancellor, Deputy Prime Minister and Foreign Secretary.
- Matt Watson – cricketer
- Sam Westaway – cricketer
- Tom Blomfield – founder and former CEO of Monzo
- Kyle Kothari – Olympic diver
- Raphael Weatherall – cricketer for Northamptonshire
- Staz Nair – actor & singer
- John Mousinho – professional footballer and manager
- Francis Wilson – meteorologist, presenter and the former Head of Weather on the BBC's Breakfast Time and Breakfast News

== Headteachers ==
- Edward Rayner 1624–1640
- ? Angell 1640–1650
- Humphrey Gardiner 1650–1676
- John Hughes 1676–1697
- ? Crowfoot 1697–1702 (Dudley Penard officiated – 1698)
- Benjamin Robertshaw 1702–1706
- not known 1706–1790
- Richard Thorne 1790–1822
- Henry Foyster 1822–1826
- Matthew Stalker 1826–1849
- W. S. Newman 1849–1850
- Edmund J Luce 1850–1862
- W. H. Williams 1862–1880
- Frederick Weller 1881–1883
- W. J. Foxell 1883–1886
- Colin J. Creed 1886–1888
- Lewis H. Pearson 1888–1889
- E. P. Cooper 1889–1897
- E. H. Wainwright 1897–1908
- R. E. Yates 1908–1935
- J. E. Simpson 1935–1937
- T. P. Oakley (acting) 1937–1938
- Neville Harrow 1938–1956
- R. Simm (acting) 1941–1945
- W. C. Porter 1956–1964
- D Holman 1965–1972
- J. A. Loarridge 1972–1992
- G. C. Hill 1993–2001
- Mark A. Fenton 2001–16
- David Atkinson 2016–

== See also ==
- List of English and Welsh endowed schools (19th century)
