= Think Global School =

THINK Global School

Information
- School type: Independent, boarding, secondary school, co-educational
- Opened: 2010
- Founders: Harald and Joann McPike
- Principal: Jen Buchanan
- Grades: 11-12
- Enrollment: 30
- Average class size: 10
- Student to teacher ratio: 4:1
- Language: English
- Accreditation: Western Association of Schools and Colleges
- Tuition: US $94,050, sliding scale
- Website: thinkglobalschool.org

THINK Global School (TGS) is an independent high school that travels the world with students studying in eight countries, over the course of two years. The school is a non-profit, co-educational, and non-denominational. THINK Global School was founded by Harald and Joann McPike.

Students at THINK Global School gain an education through the Changemaker Curriculum, engaging in place- and project-based learning relevant to the countries they travel to.

== Non-profit status ==
The school is a U.S.-registered 501(c)(3) non-profit entity and has earned the Guidestar Exchange Seal, an award given to non-profits demonstrating a commitment to transparency.

== The THINK Global School Curriculum ==
Learning at THINK Global School is centered around the school's internally developed THINK Global School Curriculum, which educates students through a blend of place and project-based learning. There are no formal classes at Think Global School, instead students participate in one multidisciplinary teacher-led module each term that draws heavily from social, environmental, historical, and cultural themes and create several personal projects of their own. For the teacher-led modules, students are either partnered up or work in groups to replicate what employees experience in the workforce.

Each teacher-led module and student-driven project comprises multiple learning targets, which are tied to psychologist Benjamin Bloom's theory of mastery learning. Students increase in mastery rank as they progress through modules and projects and their skills improve as well. These ranks are novice, specialist, and master.

Reporting at Think Global School is done quarterly at the end of each term. The school utilizes a narrative report to present a comprehensive picture of a student's time in country. Students evaluate their own learning outcomes as part of the narrative report as well as receiving feedback from their educators and advisors on their academic and social progress.

== Think Local and service learning ==
Think Global School has three components: in-country service learning, cultural experiences, and learning the local language.

=== Service learning ===
Think Global School integrates service learning into its curriculum in several ways. The first is by engaging in service-based activities in the places the school visits. Students create a project that meets a local need in their home country. These service-based projects require the student to work with stakeholders in their local community to ensure project authenticity.

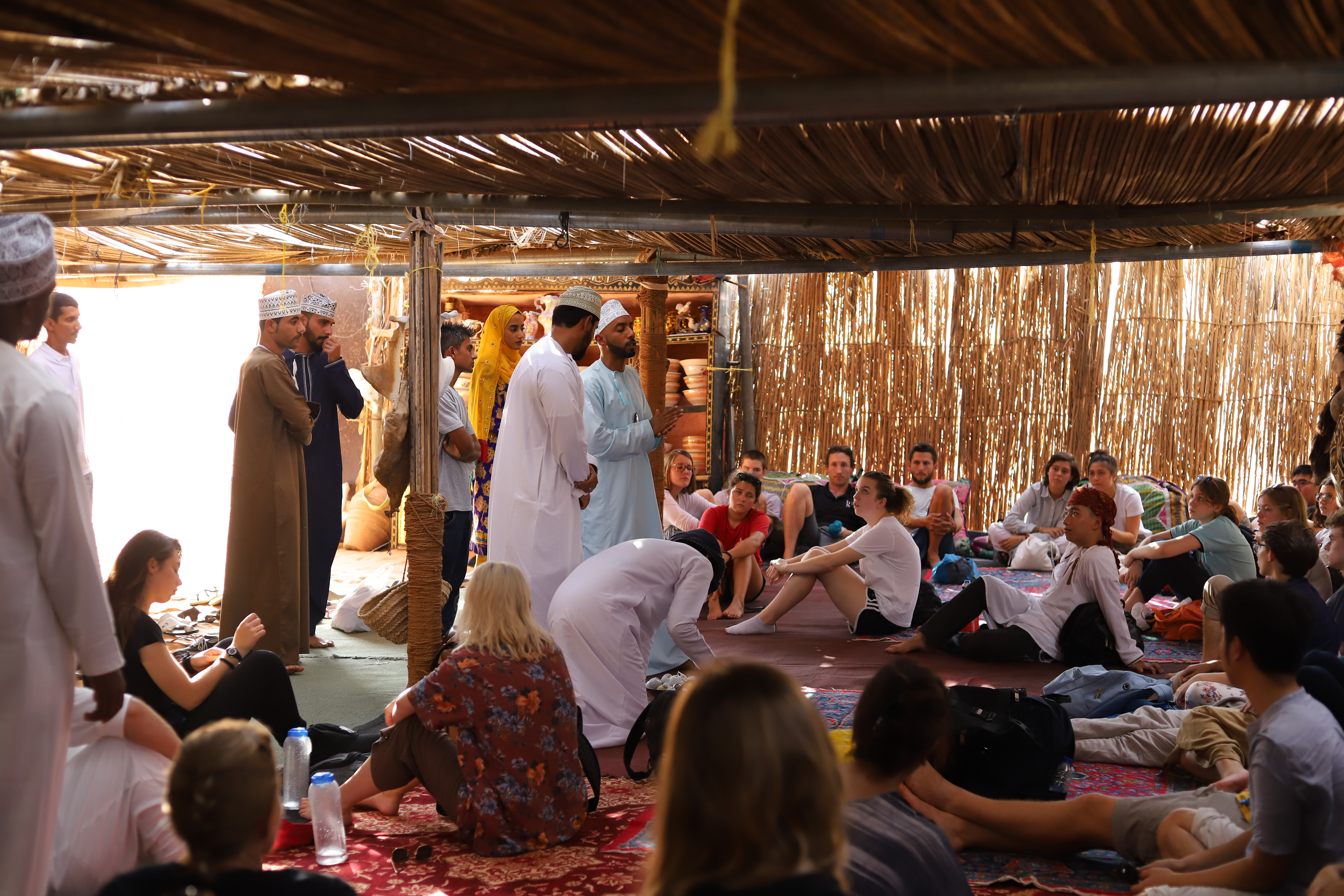
Think Global School Students learn about Bedouin life in Oman

=== Language learning ===
The school's core academic program is taught in English, and particular emphasis is placed on learning Spanish. Moreover, students are expected to acquire a basic vocabulary in the language of each term's host country, taking lessons of the local language during their time in each country.
