= Sam Westaway =

English cricketer

Personal information
- Full name: Samuel Alexander Westaway
- Born: 29 July 1992 (age 34); Welwyn Garden City, Hertfordshire, England
- Height: 6 ft 2 in (1.88 m)
- Batting: Right-handed
- Role: Wicket-keeper

Domestic team information
- Years: Team
- 2011–2016: Oxford University

Career statistics
Competition	First-class
Matches	5
Runs scored	174
Batting average	29.00
100s/50s	–/1
Top score	63*
Catches/stumpings	24/–
- Source: Cricinfo, 7 June 2020

Samuel 'Sam' Alexander Westaway (born 29 July 1992) is an English former first-class cricketer.

Westaway was born at Welwyn Garden City in July 1992. He was educated at Dr Challoner's Grammar School, before going up to Pembroke College, Oxford. While studying at Oxford, he played first-class cricket for Oxford University between 2011 and 2016, making five appearances in The University Match against Cambridge University. Playing as a wicket-keeper, he scored 174 runs in his five matches at an average of 29.00 and a high score of 69 not out. Behind the stumps he took 24 catches.
