= Denise Kingsmill, Baroness Kingsmill =

British Baroness (born 1947)

The Right Honourable The Baroness Kingsmill CBE
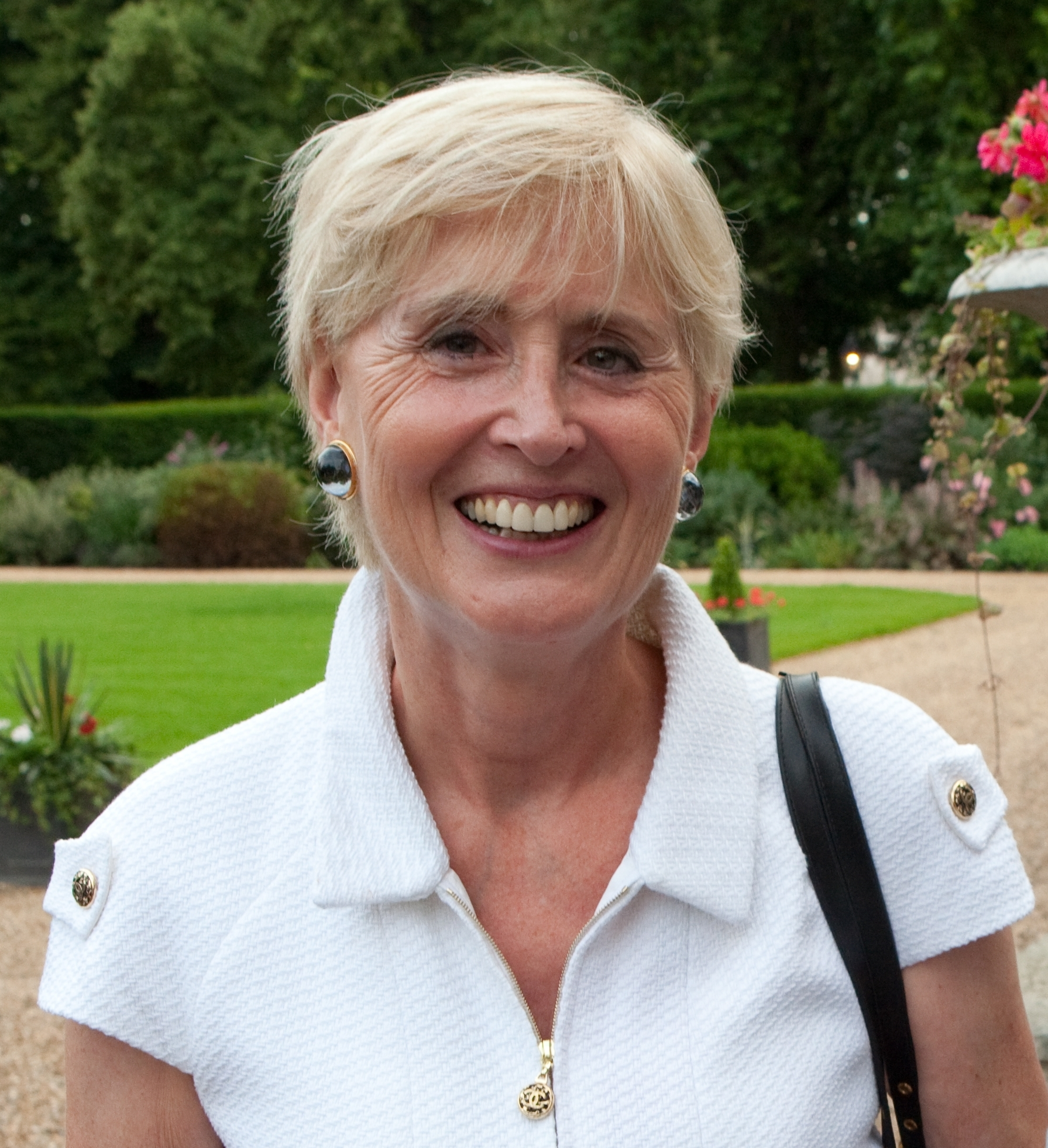

Member of the House of Lords
- Lord Temporal
- Life peerage 1 June 2006

Personal details
- Born: 24 April 1947 (age 79)

Denise Patricia Byrne Kingsmill, Baroness Kingsmill CBE (née Byrne; born 24 April 1947) is a British Labour peer. She was appointed as a life peer in 2006 after practising as a solicitor in personal injury, trade union and employment law.

She was born in New Zealand and emigrated to Wales during her childhood. She studied at Croesyceiliog School. She holds a degree in Economics and Anthropology from Girton College, Cambridge. Then one of six female undergraduates in Economics studying alongside 300 male undergraduates, Baroness Kingsmill now encourages others to blaze their own trail, saying 'you must do that which excites you'. She is a member of the Economic Affairs Committee.

She was a Deputy Chairman of the Monopolies and Mergers Commission (later known as The Competition Commission), which undertook inquiries into banking, cruise liners, equity underwriting, energy supply, and other subjects during her time. She was appointed in 1996, stepping down in 2003.

Baroness Kingsmill undertook a number of cases relating to rights of women, while specialising in employment law. She also acted in behalf of Peter Wood, founder of Direct Line and other leading business figures. She undertook two inquiries for the government in gender equality and human capital management.

Baroness Kingsmill was appointed a CBE for her services to competition and employment law in the 2000 New Year Honours.

She was created Baroness Kingsmill, of Holland Park in the Royal Borough of Kensington and Chelsea on 1 June 2006.

Kingsmill has been awarded five honorary doctorates from universities across England, Scotland and Wales, including a doctorate from Cranfield University in 2007.).

Other roles she holds or has held include:

- non-executive director of IAG (International Airlines Group)
- non-executive director of E.ON (German Energy Company)
- non-executive director of KornFerry International (world's largest executive search firm)
- Member of international advisory board of IESE Business School.
- Deputy Chairman of the Advisory board at Price Waterhouse Coopers
- Member of the Advisory board at Inditex (Zara)
- Member of the Board of Directors of Inditex (appointed on 19 July 2016)

Kingsmill writes a monthly column for Management Today magazine.

Previous roles include:

- non-executive director of Betfair
- Non-executive directorship of British Airways
- Senior adviser to the Royal Bank of Scotland
- Trustee of the Cambridge University Judge Business School
- Pro-chancellor of Brunel University
- Trustee of The Design Museum
- Chairman of the Board at Monzo

She has held other non-executive director and advisory roles, including Laing O’Rourke, Royal Bank of Scotland and Telewest Communications.

A former partner in a firm of London solicitors, Kingsmill, along with two other defendants—His Honour Judge Peter Clark and DJ Freeman & Co solicitors (the relevant firm)—was found liable for professional negligence by the Court of Appeal in 2001 for advice given in the late 1980s. Kingsmill has said that she defends this as a 'professional judgment' which she would take again.
