= Thomas Whitfield (entrepreneur) =

British/German biochemist and entrepreneur (born 1981)

- Born: 30 November 1981 (age 44); Kirkcaldy, Scotland
- Education: Christ Church, University of Oxford (DPhil (PhD))
- Occupations: biochemist, entrepreneur
- Known for: The development of dietary supplement TRX2

Thomas Whitfield (born 30 November 1981) is a British-German biochemist and entrepreneur. He is known for the dietary supplement TRX2 and his contributions to DesignTheTime.com.

== Biography ==
Whitfield was born in Kirkcaldy, Scotland. He spent his childhood and early schooling in Germany. Whitfield holds a DPhil in Biochemistry from Christ Church, University of Oxford.

== Business ventures ==
=== Designthetime.com ===
Whitfield was a co-founder and director of DesignTheTime.com (later called Miomi.com) which plots user-generated personal histories. The website garnered media attention throughout Europe and was ranked as one of the Top 10 UK Web 2.0 startups in 2007. The website went offline in 2008 for unknown reasons.

=== Oxford BioLabs ===
In 2009 Whitfield founded the company Oxford BioLabs. In 2011, its first product, a dietary supplement known as TRX2, became publicly available.
