= Quid Inc. =

American software and services company

- Type: Private
- Founded: 2010; 16 years ago
- Successor: NetBase Quid
- Headquarters: San Francisco, U.S.
- Area served: San Francisco; New York City; London
- Key people: Bob Goodson (CEO)
- Number of employees: 125
- Website: www.quid.com

Quid, Inc. is a private software and services company, specializing in text-based data analysis. Quid software claims it reads millions of documents (e.g. news articles, blog posts, company profiles, and patents) and offers insight by organizing that content visually. The company is based in San Francisco with offices in New York City and London.

Quid claimed two customer companies used Quid market landscapes for investment strategy. It has since expanded its customer base.

Quid, Inc. merged with the social analytics company NetBase on January 28, 2020.

== Customers ==
The media has cited a handful of notable Quid clients including the Boston Consulting Group, the Department of Defense, the UN Global Pulse +, various political campaigns, and the Knight Foundation.

== History ==
Quid was founded in San Francisco in 2010. In 2013, Quid was named by Fast Company as one of the World's Top 10 Most Innovative companies in Big Data. In 2016, World Economic Forum presented Quid with their Technology Pioneers award and IDC (International Data Corporation) named Quid a Top Innovator for the 2016 U.S. Financial Compliance and Risk Analytics Market.

Fast Company partnered with Quid to assist in picking its annual Most Innovative Companies list in 2016.

Quid has been quoted or used in stories by Fortune analyzing VC funding trends, The Atlantic reporting coincidences collected by a University of Cambridge professor, VentureBeat analyzing the media's backlash of Uber, Wired diving into the language used at Presidential party conventions, and more from outlets such as The Economist, The New York Times, Forbes, and the San Francisco Chronicle.

== Criticism ==
In 2010, TechCrunch asked: “Does Quid have the most pretentious website of any startup ever?” The jab followed a debate on Quora discussing the website's use of Latin, arcane typefaces, and an overly academic tone. The company has since updated its website.
