= Bob Goodson =

British technologist and entrepreneur

- Born: Robert B. Goodson; 1980 (age 45–46); Norwich, England
- Education: University of East Anglia; Oxford University
- Occupations: Technologist; entrepreneur; author; UX designer
- Years active: 2004-present
- Employer(s): Co-Founder and president, Quid
- Notable work: Like: The Button That Changed the World
- Awards: World Economic Forum Technology Pioneer Award
- Website: www.bobgoodson.com

Bob Goodson is a British technologist, entrepreneur, and author. He is the president of Quid Inc., an artificial intelligence company he co-founded in 2010, a co-inventor of the Like Button, and the co-author of Like: The Button That Changed the World.

Goodson studied medieval literature at Oxford, where he co-founded Oxford Entrepreneurs. He co-founded Quid based on his interest in language theory.

== Early life and education ==
Goodson grew up in West Beckham, Norfolk, England. He taught himself to program as a child, and started writing programs for video games at 8. In 1998, as he completed his final year of high school, he received the Norfolk Scholars Award, which recognizes high achieving students from backgrounds traditionally less likely to go to university. He started several businesses, including a yoga club, a design company, and a publishing company before beginning college in 1999.

Goodson attended the University of East Anglia. He earned a degree in English literature and philosophy and graduated with honors in 2002. He subsequently received a scholarship from the UK Arts and Humanities Research Board and began postgraduate studies in medieval literature and language theory at University College, Oxford. His graduate research focused on the analysis of medieval cento.

Goodson co-founded Oxford Entrepreneurs, a student society designed to support and facilitate entrepreneurship, in 2002. He served as the organization's founding chairman. In 2003 PayPal co-founder Max Levchin, among others, spoke at an Oxford Entrepreneurs event. Six months later, Levchin hired Goodson as the lead designer at a startup incubator in Silicon Valley, and in early 2004, he left Oxford and moved to San Francisco.

== Career ==
=== Midtown Doornail, Yelp ===
In April 2004, Goodson began working with Levchin at Midtown Doornail as a product manager. An investment company and incubator, Midtown Doornail helped to create online properties including Yelp. The same year, Goodson became Yelp's first employee. During his tenure at the company, he worked in areas including product management, UX and UI design, and business development. In May 2005, he sketched a thumbs-up/ thumbs-down icon, and in collaboration with Yelp co-founder Russel Simmons, proposed it as a tool that would increase engagement by allowing users to instantly react to restaurant reviews and encourage reviewers by offering positive feedback.

=== YouNoodle, Quid ===
In September 2007, Goodson founded YouNoodle with Kirill Makharinsky, an Oxford-trained mathematician, and Rebecca Hwang, then a Stanford Ph.D. candidate. The company was first funded by Levchin, Peter Thiel, and Founders Fund, among others.

YouNoodle’s initial product, the Start-Up Predictor, collected data from more than 3,000 sources, and used AI to determine the likelihood of a start-up's success.Launched in 2008, and geared toward the investment community, the Start-Up Predictor generated significant controversy and substantial media coverage. In 2009, Business Week challenged him to select 50 startups that would become successful. The list was revisited in 2017; a significant percentage of the companies were profitable and 20% of the startups had valuations of more than US$1 billion.

In September 2010, Goodson co-founded Quid Inc.A software company focused on natural language processing and data visualization, Quid developed a platform that enabled users to analyze and visualize relationships within large collections of unstructured text data using language and semantic processing technique. With others, Goodson was awarded a patent for entity performance analysis. In 2016, Quid was named a Technology Pioneer by the World Economic Forum.

In 2020, Quid merged with NetBase Solutions to form NetBase Quid.The combined company acquired Rival IQ in 2021, and in 2023, rebranded under the Quid name.

=== Like: The Button That Changed the World ===
Goodson came across his 2005 thumbs up/thumbs down sketch while moving house, and in 2022 teamed with Martin Reeves, a business strategist and advisor, to write Like: The Button That Changed the World. Over the following three years, Goodson and Reeves researched the creation and evolution of the like button and conducted interviews on the subject with academics and founders, among others. Reeves focused on academics, while Goodson interviewed technologists and entrepreneurs including Biz Stone, a co-founder of Twitter, Bret Taylor, now the chairman of OpenAI, and Reid Hoffman, the co-founder of LinkedIn.

== Advocacy and public speaking ==
After leaving Oxford, Goodson remained involved with Oxford Entrepreneurs, which became the largest organization of its kind in Europe. He has advocated for UK entrepreneurship in Silicon Valley since the mid-2010s through programs including Webmission, a UK government-backed initiative that brought 20 British entrepreneurs to Silicon Valley to investigate business and networking opportunities.

Goodson delivered the keynote speech at the University of Oxford's Augmented Humanity Conference in 2015. Titled The 100-Year Revolution in What It Is to Be Human, it explored AI's impact on human thinking. In addition to Oxford, he has lectured at University of Cambridge and MIT, and spoken at the annual meeting of the World Economic Forum in Davos. He was a member of the World Economic Forum’s Council on the Future of Artificial Intelligence and Robotics from 2016-2018.
