= Robert Chaloner (priest) =

DD Robert Chaloner
- Canon of Windsor
- See: Church of England
- Installed: 1589
- Term ended: 1621

Orders
- Ordination: 3 November 1592

Personal details
- Born: 1548
- Died: 1621 (aged 72–73)

Robert Chaloner DD (1548–1621) was a Canon of Windsor from 1589 to 1621.

== Career ==
He was educated at Christ Church, Oxford where he graduated BA 1566, MA in 1569, BD in 1576 and DD in 1584. He was appointed:

- Rector of Fleet Marston, Buckinghamshire 1566
- Rector of Agmondesham 1576

He was appointed to the twelfth stall in St George's Chapel, Windsor Castle in 1589, and held the stall until 1621. In his will, he left money which was used to found Dr Challoner's Grammar School in Amersham.
