= TRX2 =

Dietary supplement by Oxford BioLabs

- Inception: 2011
- Manufacturer: Oxford BioLabs
- Available: Available
- Website: oxfordbiolabs.com
- Notes; Dietary supplement

TRX2 is a dietary supplement marketed for individuals with hair loss. It is manufactured and sold by Oxford BioLabs in the United Kingdom, marketed in 2011.

== Etymology and Formulation ==
The name TRX2 is said to be derived from the Ancient Greek word trichos, meaning hair and the number 2 stands for second generation. The proper word for hair in Ancient Greek is however thrix (θρίξ).

TRX2 contains amino acids and vitamins. Its ingredients are L-carnitine, L-tartaric acid, potassium chloride, L-leucine, isoleucine, valine, nicotinic acid, and biotin.

The product is a dietary supplement, not a drug, and hence it does not need approval by the U.S. Food and Drug Administration (FDA).

== Oxford BioLabs ==
Oxford BioLabs was founded in August 2008 as a Limited Liability Company in England and Wales by former scientists of the University of Oxford, including biochemist and entrepreneur Thomas Whitfield. The company have German based Research Facilities located in Biopark Regensburg, Regensburg, Germany. According to an article published by The Daily Telegraph the company is bootstrapped by its founders as well as by NESTA and the National Council for Graduate Entrepreneurship (NCGE).

== Clinical Studies ==
TRX2 has been tested by Oxford Biolabs in a clinical study. In the study, 59 male and female volunteers showing signs of alopecia completed 18 months of therapy, receiving either TRX2 or a placebo.

The results of the study showed that 26 (out of a total 29) participants who had taken TRX2 recorded an increase of at least 10% in the number of hair strands in the evaluation area and/or a 10% increase in hair weight.

The third-party studies took place in 2019 and were conducted by the European Research Institute Dermatest.

== Controversy ==
In January 2014 the UK Advertising Standards Authority upheld a complaint against TRX2 and Oxford Biolabs, citing that advertisements that the company had run for TRX2 were misleading and in breach of EU advertising codes. The company agreed and changed their advertising in line with the code of conduct.

== See also ==
- Thomas Whitfield
- Lonza
