= GoCardless =

Financial technology company based in the UK

- Type: Private
- Industry: Financial technology services
- Founded: February 24, 2011; 15 years ago
- Founders: Hiroki Takeuchi; Tom Blomfield; Matt Robinson
- Headquarters: London, United Kingdom
- Key people: Hiroki Takeuchi (CEO)
- Products: Direct Debit payments Open Banking; Payment processing
- Website: gocardless.com

GoCardless is a British fintech company that specialises in bank payments including recurring payments, Direct Debit processing and Open Banking. GoCardless is headquartered in London.

GoCardless provides a payment gateway that enables businesses to set up and manage payments, subscriptions and invoices with automated payment processing. As of 2025, the company's technology is used by 100,000 businesses and processes $130 billion of transactions every year.

== History ==
GoCardless was founded in 2011 by Hiroki Takeuchi, Matt Robinson, and Tom Blomfield, who were students at Oxford University at the time. Incorporated in England and Wales as GoCardless Ltd on 18 January 2011, the company established its registered headquarters in London. The company's initial focus was on providing a platform for small and medium-sized businesses to collect recurring payments via direct debit. In 2012, the company received £1.5 million in funding from investors, including Y Combinator, Google Ventures, Salesforce and Accel Partners.

In 2013, GoCardless launched its service in the United Kingdom, and the company expanded into Europe in 2014, launching in France, Germany, and Spain following its $7M Series B which was led by Balderton Capital. In 2017, the company raised $22.5 million in a Series D funding round, bringing its total funding to $47.2 million. In 2018, GoCardless launched its service in the United States with an office opening in San Francisco. In 2020, the company expanded into Australia and New Zealand and raised $95 million, becoming a startup unicorn.

In 2022, the company raised $312 million in investment valuing it at $2.1 billion.

In early 2025, Dutch payments firm Mollie was reported to be in talks to acquire GoCardless, in a deal that would combine two of Europe's largest privately held fintech companies. Those reports suggested the transaction could value GoCardless at around $1.5 billion, compared with its $2.1 billion valuation in 2022. In December 2025, Mollie announced that it had signed an agreement to acquire GoCardless for €1.05 billion in a mostly stock-based deal, forming a combined group valued at around €3 billion. The transaction is subject to regulatory approvals and is expected to close by mid-2026. The acquisition closed in September 2026.

== Partnerships and acquisitions ==
In 2018, GoCardless partnered with QuickBooks, a maker of cloud-based accounting software, to offer customers direct debit as a payment option. The partnership provided QuickBooks' customers with a way to collect recurring payments from their customers.

In 2020, GoCardless announced a partnership with Zuora, a cloud-based subscription management platform. The partnership aimed to simplify the subscription billing process for Zuora's customers by providing them with access to GoCardless' global direct debit network.

In July 2022, GoCardless announced that it had signed an agreement to acquire the Open Banking provider Nordigen for an undisclosed sum.

In March 2024, it was announced GoCardless had acquired the payment services company, Sentenial (operating globally under the Nuapay brand), from its Australian parent-company, EML Payments for an undisclosed amount.

== Products and services ==
The company offers an API that enables businesses to integrate GoCardless into their own websites or applications, as well as pre-built integrations with accounting and billing software such as Xero, QuickBooks, and Zuora. The company aims to provide an alternative to traditional payment methods, such as credit and debit cards, which can be costly for businesses to manage.

In addition to its payment processing services, GoCardless provides a variety of tools to help businesses manage their payments, including real-time payment tracking and reporting, payment failure alerts, and customer insights.

In 2020 the company launched a service called GoCardless for Salesforce, which allows businesses to collect payments and manage their customer data within Salesforce's customer relationship management (CRM) platform.
