= Grouper social club =

American, online trip-planning service

Grouper
- Founded: 2011
- Founder: Michael Waxman, Tom Brown
- Defunct: October 1, 2016
- Headquarters: New York City
- Services: Offline social club
- Number of employees: 25

Grouper was an online, invite-only social club that uses data gathered from Facebook profiles to organize group outings (called Groupers). Matches for the outings were gathered and analyzed first by a computer and then by a human to ensure strong matches. The excursions were planned in venues throughout 25 cities for six people. Groupers consisted of two groups of three friends and can consist of three males and three females, six males, six females, or any other possible combination.

Michael Waxman founded the New York-based startup in 2011. The company was run by a staff of 25 people. Time Inc. listed Grouper in its 10 NYC startups to watch for 2013. Three years later, in October 2016, the company shut down.

== How it works ==
Grouper was an invite-only service that matched two individuals according to data found – with the permission of the user – on the user's Facebook profile, including age, career, education, etc. The company determined a match between two individuals using both algorithms and its member experience team. A time was then set for the "Grouper". The two parties were asked to each bring two friends. No names, photos, or information were disclosed before the actual meet. Upon arrival at the determined location, the group received a complimentary first round of drinks, including tax and tip, at a reserved table (the cost was included in Grouper's service fee).

The company offered arrangements for both opposite- and same-sex Groupers.

== Communication with users ==
Grouper featured real-time customer relationship management (CRM). The service also granted users direct contact with the director of membership experience, who engaged users with personalized reminder texts and bits of advice for success on Groupers.

The member experience team communicated with users throughout the Grouper. Users received a customized message from the member experience team on the morning after their grouper inquiring as to how the night out went. This feedback was analyzed and stored for future matching.

== Active cities and expansion ==
For more than a year after its initial launch, Grouper was only available in New York City. By June 2012, the service had grown to San Francisco and Washington D.C.

By September 2012, Grouper had expanded its services to 10 additional cities, Atlanta, Austin, Brooklyn, Boston, Chicago, Los Angeles, Seattle, Miami, Philadelphia, and Dallas. By December 2012, Grouper became available to users in Toronto.

By 2013, the company reported its services were officially available in 25 cities in the US and Toronto, including new additions Nashville, Denver, London, and others.

== Technological developments ==
In April 2013, the meet-up service released its Grouper iPhone app. The company has reported that the app, which features push notifications and alerts, allowed users to set up a Grouper in as little as an hour, avoiding the long questionnaires other services require their users to fill out.

== Partnerships and acquisitions ==
Y Combinator, a company that funds startups, was the primary backing for Grouper.

In October 2012, Grouper announced its Hackation program. The concept involved flying select designers and software developers to New York City for a week-long, expenses-paid trip. The company invited the designers into their headquarters to work on new Grouper product development and brainstorm with the team.

Grouper arranged the trip after establishing partnerships with Airbnb and Hipmunk.

Grouper announced a partnership with Uber in January 2013. The alliance was made to encourage users to utilize Uber for transportation on Grouper dates.
