= Starling Bank =

Challenger bank in the United Kingdom

Starling Bank Limited
- Trade name: Starling Bank
- Type: Private
- Industry: Financial services
- Founded: 18 June 2014; 12 years ago
- Founder: Anne Boden
- Headquarters: London, United Kingdom
- Area served: United Kingdom
- Key people: Raman Bhatia CEO
- Products: Retail banking (personal & business)
- Revenue: ▼£887.4 million (2026)
- Operating income: ▼£217.1 million (2026)
- Net income: ▲£156.0 million (2026)
- Total assets: ▲£16,639.9 million (2026)
- Total equity: ▲£1,204.9 million (2026)
- Number of employees: 4,158 (2026)
- Website: www.starlingbank.com

Starling Bank (/ˈstɑːrlɪŋ/) is a British bank, occasionally referred to as a digital challenger bank or neobank, providing current and business bank accounts in the United Kingdom. Starling Bank is a licensed and regulated bank, founded by former Allied Irish Banks COO, Anne Boden, in January 2014. Since its founding, it has received over £500M of funding.

The bank offers a range of limited personal and business banking services through its mobile app including, among other services, personal current accounts, joint accounts, business accounts, and Euro accounts. With a focus on technology and user experience, Starling Bank has become an alternative to traditional high-street banks. The bank’s headquarters are in London, United Kingdom. It is authorised by the Prudential Regulation Authority and the Financial Conduct Authority.

== History ==
Starling Bank was founded as a digital challenger bank by Anne Boden in January 2014. The company received its banking licence from the Prudential Regulation Authority and the Financial Conduct Authority in July 2016. It launched its beta for personal current accounts in March 2017. In March 2018, Starling launched business accounts. In February 2019, it launched personal Euro accounts in the UK. Initially Starling customers could make fee-free conversions between the Starling GBP account and Euro account, but in September 2019 the bank introduced a 0.4% conversion fee.

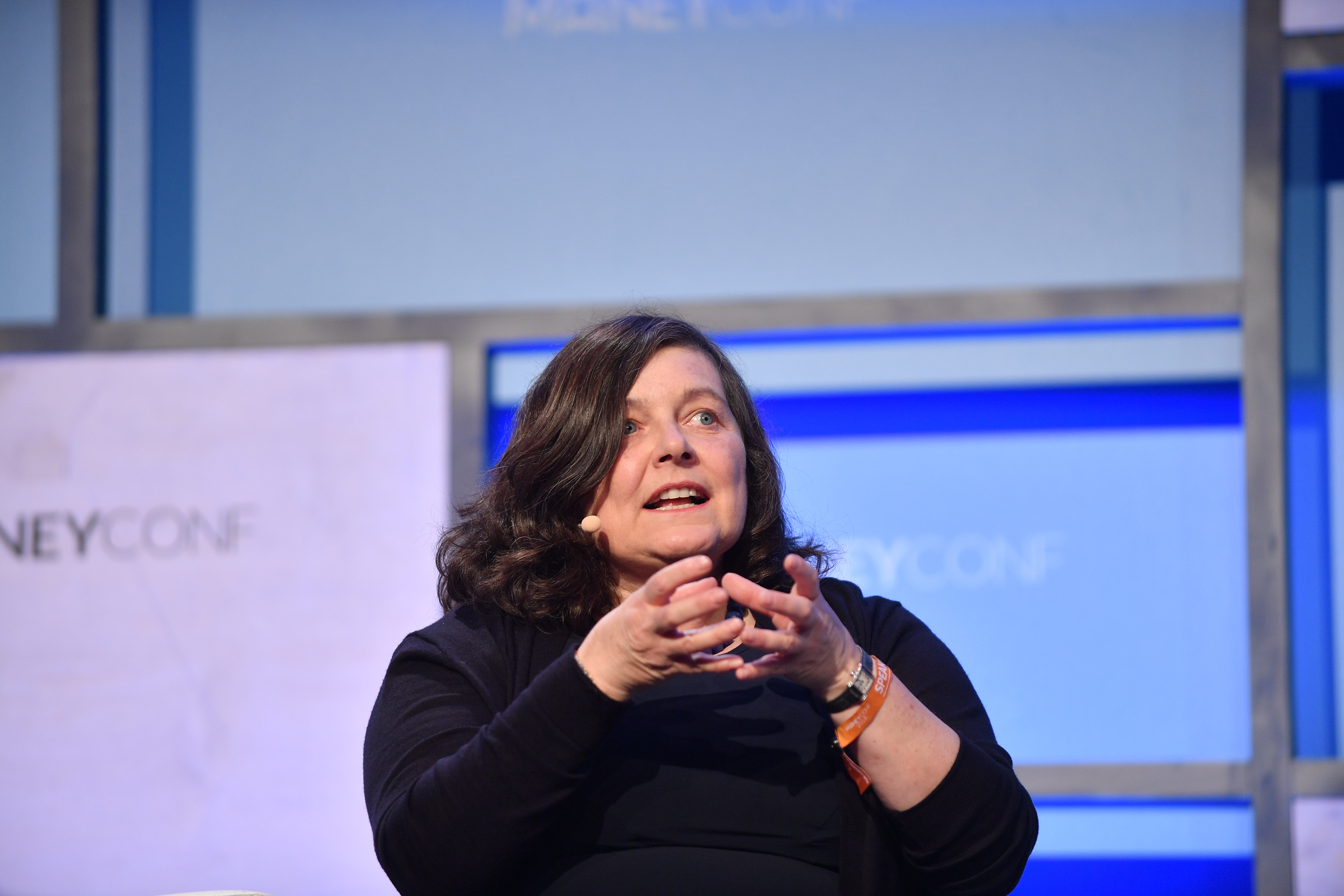
Anne Boden, former CEO and founder of Starling Bank, speaking at MoneyConf in 2018

In 2016, Starling raised £48 million. Founder Anne Boden announced in December 2017 that the bank intended to apply for the RBS Remedies Fund. In February 2019, Starling raised £75m from Merian Global Investors. The following week, the company announced it had raised £100m from the Capability and Innovation Fund in the form of grant funding. In March 2021, Starling announced a £272m funding round, with investors including Fidelity, the Qatar Investment Authority and Millennium Management.

The bank has partnered with other companies to offer some of its services. In March 2017, Starling began to use Wise to process international payments. In November 2018, the company partnered with the Post Office to allow account holders to deposit and withdraw funds at any Post Office branch.

In late 2020, The Times reported that larger banks were looking at acquiring Starling. The CEO of Starling denied reports and stated they aimed for an initial public offering by 2022.

In its annual report for the year ending 31 March 2022, Starling founder, Boden, put the company's profitability down to its push into the mortgage market, which saw it grow its mortgage loan book to over £2 billion. In June 2022, it revealed that customers had opened 3 million Starling current accounts, including more than 460,000 business current accounts.

In March 2024, the company announced the appointment of Raman Bhatia as its new, permanent chief executive, joining from OVO Energy. Bhatia took up the position formally that summer, replacing John Mountain. In his first major policy change, Bhatia ordered all hybrid staff to travel to work for a minimum of 10 days each month.

In October 2024, the Financial Conduct Authority (FCA) fined Starling Bank £29 million ($38.5 million) for deficiencies in its anti-money laundering controls and sanctions screening systems, which dated back to 2017. The FCA noted that Starling opened over 54,000 accounts for 49,000 high-risk customers between September 2021 and November 2023. Problems were first identified in 2021 during a review of financial crime controls in the challenger bank sector. By January 2023, the bank discovered its screening system had only assessed a fraction of the sanctions list since 2017. Starling accepted the FCA's findings, apologized for the historical failings, and emphasized that it had invested significantly to rectify these issues, including enhancing board governance. Although the initial fine was set at £41 million, Starling received a 30% discount for its cooperation with the FCA.

=== Rebrand ===
In September 2025, Starling Bank announced a major visual and strategic refresh, introducing a new logo, colour palette, card designs, and shifting its public identity from “Starling Bank” to simply “Starling”. Along with the rebrand, Starling Bank has introduced AI‑driven tools such as Spending Intelligence and image‑generation for Spaces in app.

== 2026 restructuring ==
In July 2026, Starling Bank announced a restructuring of its banking and technology operations that would result in the loss of approximately 130 jobs. This followed the loss of 150 jobs earlier in the year when the bank shuttered its London-based customer support operations. The bank said the reorganisation was intended to simplify operations, eliminate duplicate roles, increase the use of artificial intelligence, and improve collaboration to accelerate product development. According to the company, the changes followed the completion of several major internal projects.

The restructuring was announced after Starling reported a 6% decline in annual revenue to £887 million and a 3% fall in pre-tax profit to £217 million for the year ending March 2026. The bank attributed the weaker financial performance in part to continued investment in Engine, its banking software platform, and lower interest income following reductions in Bank of England base rates.

Starling also reaffirmed its strategy of expanding Engine internationally, particularly in North America, where it planned to market the platform to mid-sized banks and credit unions. Chief executive Raman Bhatia said that expanding the software business internationally would be less capital-intensive than growing a regulated consumer banking business overseas.

== Locations ==
Starling does not have physical branches. The company has offices in London, Cardiff, Southampton and Manchester. For customers who want to deposit cash into their accounts, it has partnered with the Post Office to offer services in branches and other designated locations across the UK.

== Cards ==
A debit card issued by Starling Bank.

Starling Bank offers a contactless Debit Mastercard. As of September 2019, Starling cards were not part of the LINK network.

Starling changed the design of its cards in July 2018, to a vertical card design coloured teal and navy. In March 2021, Starling announced their new and replacement debit cards would be made from 75% of recycled rigid PVC plastic.

In addition to physical cards, Starling Bank also offers its customers the ability to create multiple virtual cards within the app. These virtual cards can be used for online purchases and can be set up. Customers can also set limits, block and unblock their virtual cards for security and control. The ability to create multiple virtual cards allows customers to easily separate their spending into different categories, such as entertainment, groceries, or travel, making it easier to track spending.

== Mobile apps ==
The focus on technology and user experience has been a key differentiator for Starling Bank. The bank primarily serves customers via mobile banking apps on iOS and Android.

The features of Starling's mobile apps include instant notifications of transactions, freezing and unfreezing customers' cards to prevent unauthorised transactions, categorising transactions for later analysis, creating separate "Spaces" where money can be stored separately to a customer's main balance, and in-app chat with customer service representatives. The bank also offers a 'Settle Up' feature, where customers can send money to their contacts. The app also features real-time notifications and spending insights, aiding customers in making informed financial decisions. In 2017, Starling claimed to be the first UK bank to support in-app setup for Apple Pay.

== Engine ==
In February 2022, Starling created a subsidiary business for its banking-as-a-service platform, Engine, through which it plans to white-label to other firms to allow them to use its systems for processing payments, card transactions and opening customer accounts.

As part of the company's 2025 rebrand, during which it dropped "Bank" from its name, Starling placed additional emphasis on Engine as its core technology platform business. Reports noted that the move reflects Starling's shift toward high-margin, scalable Software-as-a-Service (SaaS) banking-infrastructure services, with Engine reporting a 284% year-on-year revenue increase in 2024 and targeting £100 million in the short to medium term.

In September 2025, Starling announced plans to expand Engine's footprint to North America, including a regional office in New York.

Welsh Government video of Anne Boden introducing herself and Starling Bank, July 2020

== Acquisitions ==
=== Fleet Mortgages ===
In July 2021, Starling announced it had acquired specialist buy-to-let mortgage lender Fleet Mortgages for £50 million. Fleet Mortgages had around £1.75 billion of mortgages under management at the time of the acquisition. Starling said Fleet Mortgages would retain its brand and management team.

=== Masthaven ===
In June 2022, Starling bought a £500 million mortgage portfolio from specialist lender Masthaven. Masthaven had announced plans to wind down its operations by selling its mortgage book by 2023.

== Senior leadership ==
- Chairman: David Sproul (since October 2021)
- Chief Executive: Raman Bhatia (since March 2024)

=== List of former chairs ===
1. Oliver Stockton (2015–2021)

=== List of former chief executives ===
1. Anne Boden (2014–2023)
2. John Mountain (Interim) (2023–2024)

== See also ==
- Neobanks in Europe
- List of banks in the United Kingdom
