= Monzo =

British neobank

Monzo Bank Limited
- Trade name: Monzo
- Formerly: Focus FS Limited (2015–2016)
- Industry: Financial services
- Founded: 18 February 2015; 11 years ago
- Founder: Gary Dolman; Jason Bates; Jonas Huckestein; Paul Rippon; Tom Blomfield
- Headquarters: London, England, UK
- Key people: Gary Hoffman (Chairman); Diana Layfield (CEO)
- Products: Banking
- Revenue: ▲£1,712.3 million (2026)
- Operating income: ▲£87.3 million (2026)
- Net income: ▼£86.3 million (2026)
- Total assets: ▲£27,605.7 million (2026)
- Total equity: ▲£1,283.5 million (2026)
- Owner: Passion Capital Fs (Gp) Llp (2016–2021); Monzo Bank Holding Group Limited (2021–present)
- Number of employees: 5,275 (2026)
- Website: monzo.com

Monzo Bank Limited, trading as Monzo (/ˈmɒnzoʊ/), is a British online bank based in London, England. Monzo launched as part of a number of app-based challenger banks entering the UK market.

Originally operating through a mobile app and a prepaid debit card, in April 2017 its UK banking licence restrictions were lifted, enabling it to offer a full current account. As of May 2026, Monzo reported having more than 15.2 million customers and customer deposits exceeding £25 billion.

== History ==
=== 2015–2017: Early growth ===
Monzo Bank was founded as Mondo in 2015 by Tom Blomfield and his team. The team originally met whilst working at Starling Bank. In February 2016, Monzo set the record for "quickest crowd-funding campaign in history" when it raised £1 million in 96 seconds via the Crowdcube investment platform.

On 15 May 2016, Monzo was named the 59th top startup in Startups.co.uk's annual Startups 100 ranking.

On 13 June 2016, a company blog post announced that the "Mondo" trademark had been legally challenged by an undisclosed company with a similar name. As a result, a naming suggestion contest was organised and the new name, "Monzo", was registered at Companies House under the legal name "Monzo Bank Ltd" in August 2016.

On 16 May 2017, Monzo announced that over £250 million had been spent through its prepaid card, between 200,000 customers.

=== 2017–present: Scaling up ===
In April 2017, Monzo was granted its full banking licence by the Prudential Regulation Authority and the Financial Conduct Authority, having previously operated under a restricted banking licence. The full licence allowed Monzo to provide its customers with current accounts, who up until that point were only able to be offered pre-paid debit cards.

Monzo's full current account was launched in October 2017, with its pre-paid card users being asked to move to its new current account. By April 2018, it was reported to have 500,000 current account customers.

In October 2018, Monzo reached one million customers, and was also named the best tech startup to work for by LinkedIn UK.

In August 2019, the company announced that it had inadvertently logged 480,000 customer personal identification numbers, making them accessible to Monzo's internal team of engineers. The issue arose because PINs were transmitted in the query string of a HTTPS request. That month the company also launched its loan products for customers.

In March 2020, Monzo announced the creation of two business bank accounts for sole traders and small-to-medium sized businesses. This was followed by Monzo's first loan products for its personal current account customers in April 2020.

In May 2020, Blomfield announced that he was moving from CEO to president of the company and TS Anil would become the company's CEO. He left the company in January 2021, citing personal pressures heightened by the coronavirus pandemic among other reasons.

In March 2023, the company announced that it had become profitable for the first time. The following year, Monzo was named to the 2024 CNBC Disruptor 50 list.

Monzo reported its first annual profit of £15.4 million for the year ending March 2024, compared to a £116.3 million loss the previous year. The company also announced to open an office in Ireland to expand into Europe. Revenue more than doubled to £514.4 million due to increased lending and savings products, though provisions for loan defaults nearly doubled to £204 million.

On 30 October 2025, Monzo announced that its CEO T. S. Anil will be stepping down from the position, after serving in that position for nearly 5 years.

In December 2025, it was announced that Monzo had agreed to acquire the online mortgage broker Habito, which at that time employed 100 people. The transaction, subject to regulatory approval and expected to complete in spring 2026, aimed to integrate mortgage advice and broking services directly into Monzo’s mobile banking platform. The company also received a full banking licence from the Central Bank of Ireland and the European Central Bank, enabling expansion into Ireland with personal and business accounts.

In July 2026, Monzo and the centre for inclusive money at nest announced a partnership to research and test methods to help self-employed workers increase retirement savings through bank-based behavioural interventions.

=== U.S. expansion ===
Monzo announced on 13 June 2019 that it would begin offering services in the United States. The company said that it would distribute about 2,000 debit cards to prospective members who attended events it held in major U.S. cities like Los Angeles, San Francisco and New York City.

In February 2021, Monzo announced Carol Nelson as the new US CEO, taking over from TS Anil who became Monzo's global CEO after temporarily holding both titles.

After it was told by US regulators it was unlikely to be approved for a banking licence, Monzo announced that it had withdrawn its banking licence application in October 2021. Shortly after, Carol Nelson stepped down as US CEO.

Monzo US exited beta and was fully launched on 1 February 2022. Without a US banking licence, Monzo operates in the US market through a partnership with Ohio-based Sutton Bank.

On 31 March 2026, Monzo announced that it would be exiting the US market, citing a strategic decision to focus on their core markets and accelerate growth across the UK and Europe.

=== Acquisition by Nubank ===
On 26 September 2026, it was reported that Nubank had expressed interest in acquiring Monzo for a price in the region of £8 billion to £10 billion. Nubank later denied the reports.

== Fundraising ==
In February 2016, Monzo set the record for "quickest crowd-funding campaign in history" when it raised £1 million in 96 seconds via the Crowdcube investment platform.

In October 2016, Monzo announced an 'interim' funding round valuing the company at £50M and raised £4.8M in the process, led by Passion Capital. This round was followed by a second £2.5 million Crowdcube crowd-funding campaign with the total pledged quickly hitting the target amount.

In February 2017, Monzo raised £19.5 million from Thrive Capital, Passion Capital, and Orange Digital Ventures, which it intended to supplement with a crowdfunding campaign for an additional £2.5 million.

On 6 November 2017, Monzo raised £71 million from several investors in a round led by Goodwater Capital. At the close of the round, Monzo was valued at £280 million.

On 5 December 2018, Monzo held another £20 million Crowdcube crowdfunding campaign, reaching nearly £18 million in funding in less than three hours, and reaching the £20 million goal in just over two days.

In 2019 the BBC's Watchdog programme investigated Monzo after receiving complaints from Monzo customers who had their accounts frozen or closed. Affected customers complained about the length of time they were unable to access their money. In a response to this investigation, the company said that account closures take place if the bank "suspect[s] there's financial crime".

On 24 June 2019, Monzo raised £113 million in a Series F funding round led by Y Combinator's Continuity fund. This round gave Monzo a valuation of £2 billion.

In June 2020, Monzo closed a £60 million 'down round', which saw its valuation fall by 40% to £1.24 billion. In December 2020, Monzo closed another £60 million funding, including from investors such as for Novator, Kaiser and TED Global.

In December 2021, Monzo closed a $600M funding round at a valuation of $4.5bn, led by the Abu Dhabi Growth Fund.

Jeremy Hunt was rejected for a bank account with Monzo in 2022. Staff at the bank have been accused of branding the Conservative Party 'evil'.

In July 2023, Gina Miller's True and Fair Party was informed that their bank account with Monzo would be closed. Monzo said that they did not accept political parties as customers, and that True and Fair's account was not originally categorised as such in its application.

In April 2024, Monzo fundraised £500m in a round involving investors Hedosophia and GIC. Monzo achieved profitability and a valuation exceeding £4bn.

In October 2024, Monzo conducted a secondary share sale at a $5.9 billion valuation, providing liquidity to employees. Investors including GIC and StepStone Group participated in the transaction.

In 2025 Monzo was fined £21 million by the Financial Conduct Authority for having inadequate financial crime controls. These included allowing "obviously implausible UK addresses when applying for an account", including Buckingham Palace and 10 Downing Street.

== Products and services ==
=== Partnership with Flux ===
On 28 January 2019, Monzo announced a partnership with Flux to add itemised receipts and loyalty points. In addition to this, the API to create receipts was published by Monzo.

=== Monzo Plus and Monzo Premium ===
In July 2020, Monzo introduced Monzo Plus, a paid subscription service that attracted 50,000 sign-ups in its first month.

=== Contents Insurance ===
Monzo became the first UK digital bank to launch contents insurance in 2025. Research showed 50% of UK renters lack contents insurance, with average belongings worth £12,140.

The product features:

- Coverage for damage and theft inside and outside the home
- Simple 5-question application process
- No-fee policy changes or cancellations
- Optional coverage for high-value items

== Issued cards ==
The original design for the hot coral-coloured current account cards

Monzo initially issued (with partner company Wirecard) a variety of alpha, beta and investor cards to its customers who wanted to be early adopters. These were prepaid Mastercards which the user could top-up via bank transfer or via an existing debit card. The balance on the card could then be spent via contactless, chip and pin, magnetic stripe or online. From early on, Monzo has issued cards in a neon "hot coral" colour – initially intended as a temporary measure during prototyping – but later, a deliberate decision arising from the success of the "eye-catching" design.

In December 2017, Monzo issued new Debit Mastercard cards to all its existing and new customers as the bank began rolling out current accounts. Customers signing up for the current account are issued a Debit Mastercard.

== Developer tools ==
Banks in the UK currently offer customers limited or no programmatic access to their financial data. Whilst the UK Government is looking into legislation to require existing banks to comply with and adopt standards for secure and open APIs, Monzo has already released a prototype API based on the OAuth standard within a year of the company's founding.

The company has also hosted four hackathons and previously maintained a "Monzo Developers" Slack channel for developer discussion and support. The API allows developers to view transactions and accounts, receive notifications for events via webhooks and create their own items to appear in the app. The responses are encoded using JSON which allows for data access in any programming language with JSON support.

== Leadership ==
- Chairman: Gary Hoffman (since February 2019)
- Chief Executive: Diana Layfield (since February 2026)

=== List of former chairmen ===
1. Baroness Kingsmill (2015–2018)

=== List of former chief executives ===
1. Tom Blomfield (2015–2020)
2. TS Anil (2020–2026)

== See also ==
- Neobanks in Europe
- List of banks in the United Kingdom
