= 1957 Bank Rate Tribunal =

1957 United Kingdom tribunal

The Bank Rate Tribunal was a 1957 United Kingdom tribunal established under the Tribunals of Inquiry (Evidence) Act 1921 to inquire into the allegations that an increase in Official Bank Rate had been improperly discussed ahead of its public announcement by the Bank of England. Rumours and allegations had circulated that some financiers had taken advantage of their advance knowledge of a planned Bank rate rise, and so the inquiry primarily sought to establish whether there had been a form of insider trading.

The Tribunal took evidence in the winter of 1957, under the chairmanship of Lord Justice Parker, with Milner Holland CBE QC and Geoffrey de Paiva Veale QC. It reported on 21 January 1958. It ultimately concluded that there was "no justification for allegations that information about the raising of the Bank Rate was improperly disclosed to any person". The inquiry attracted some attention in the winter of 1957 as details of the interactions amongst financiers - and between bankers, Bank of England officials, and government figures - became public, shining some light on how the City of London operated. The Report particularly attracted attention through a two-day debate in the House of Commons in February 1958, and the press reaction to the Report was "distinctly critical", with suggestions that the Report was a whitewash.

== Background ==
The Bank Rate had been increased in September 1957, but rumours rapidly circulated around the City of London that some financiers - who simultaneously held positions within the Bank of England and within private financial companies - took advantage of advance warning of the rate rise to sell gilt-edged securities ahead of the public announcement. The rumours gained credibility when the diplomat Laurence Pumphrey reported a conversation concerning a possible leak of the proposed rate rise; his cousin, who worked as a secretary in Conservative Central Office, told him that the proposed rate rise was common knowledge in her office before the public announcement. In order to ensure that the matter was properly investigated, he reported the conversation to the Labour Opposition rather than to his superiors at the Foreign and Commonwealth Office.

The Shadow Chancellor Harold Wilson pushed hard for an independent inquiry, but the prime minister Harold Macmillan was adamant than an inquiry be led by his Cabinet colleague the Lord Chancellor Viscount Kilmuir. Pressure continued to mount on the Government, and there was uproar in the House of Commons when Labour MP Leslie Plummer accused the Government of leaking the planned rate rise to The Daily Telegraph and the Financial Times. Macmillan agreed to have an independent inquiry under Lord Justice Parker.

== The tribunal ==
The inquiry heard evidence through the winter of 1957, and reported its findings on 21 January 1958. Much of the questioning was undertaken by the Attorney General Reginald Manningham-Buller. As a member of the Government, he directed the line of his questioning primarily at City of London financiers, rather than at the Government. This provoked consternation amongst many of the City's bankers, who believed that the Government was trying to avoid the inquiry's scrutiny, and some believed that Government sought to scapegoat them. Much of the questioning focused on two non-executive directors of the Bank of England who also held positions in private financial companies. One of these two non-executive directors (Hugh Kindersley) had interests in Lazard, Royal Exchange Assurance, and the British Match Company, which between them had sold £2.5 million of gilts in the two days before the official rate rise announcement. The sales were interpreted as a sharp change in the strategies of those businesses only days before the public announcement.

The proceedings aroused a degree of public interest into what The New Yorker called "a revealing glimpse into a special, jealously guarded world" that involved euphemistic conversations on Scottish grouse moors during shooting parties, cabled messages to Hong Kong, and the casual movement of millions of pounds of securities. There was interest as to how efficiently and responsibly the Bank of England was managed, and speculation that its senior directors holding simultaneous positions in private financial firms constituted a conflict of interest.

== The report ==
Published on 21 January 1958, Lord Justice Parker's report found that there was "no justification for allegations that information about the raising of the Bank Rate was improperly disclosed to any person" and that "in every case the information disclosed was treated by the recipient as confidential and ... no use of such information was made for the purpose of private gain". The exoneration of everybody involved - government, Bank of England, and the individual financiers - attracted critical press comment, and has since been interpreted as a possible whitewash.

== Aftermath ==
Although the inquiry exonerated all involved, the details of the interactions between private financial institutions, the Bank of England, and the government created quite a public stir. The economist and journalist Andrew Schonfield criticised the Bank of England as an outmoded and sluggishly amateurish operation, and Labour continued to criticise the Macmillan Government for its perceived cosiness with high finance.

The inquiry ran concurrent to the ongoing Committee on the Working of the Monetary System under the chairmanship of the esteemed Lord Radcliffe, which produced the Radcliffe Report in 1959. Although the extent of the report's impact is debated, it was a further focus of dissatisfaction with the monetary system as it was operating in the 1950s. The Radcliffe Report made several recommendations regarding reform of the Bank of England, particularly with regard as to how Official Bank Rate was to be set and how decisions in its changes were to be communicated. For example, part-time and non-executive directors of the Bank of England were to be excluded from discussions of Bank Rate. Although few of the recommendations of the Radcliffe Report were immediately implemented by government, the report's findings reinforced a discontent with the monetary system that had also been expressed throughout the proceedings of the Bank Rate Tribunal.

== Bibliography ==
- David Kynaston, Till Time's Last Stand: A History of The Bank of England, 1694-2013, Bloomsbury Publishing, 2017.
- John Fforde, "The Bank of England and Public Policy, 1941-1958", Cambridge, 1992.
- Alistair Horne, "Macmillan: The Official Biography", Viking, 1989.
