= Baron Parker of Waddington =

Baron Parker of Waddington may refer to:

- Robert Parker, Baron Parker of Waddington (1857–1918), Lord of Appeal in Ordinary from 1913 to 1918, father of Hubert Parker
- Hubert Parker, Baron Parker of Waddington (1900–1972), Lord Chief Justice of England from 1958 to 1971, son of Robert Parker
