= Lord Parker =

Lord Parker may refer to:

- Thomas Parker, 1st Earl of Macclesfield (1666–1732), Whig politician, Lord Chief Justice and Lord Chancellor
- Robert Parker, Baron Parker of Waddington (1857–1918), Lord of Appeal in Ordinary
- Hubert Parker, Baron Parker of Waddington (1900–1972), Lord Chief Justice and life peer, son of Robert Parker
- Andrew Parker, Baron Parker of Minsmere (born 1962), Lord Chamberlain, former Director General of MI5
