= Llanychan =

Parish in Denbighshire, Wales

Coordinates: 53.14896°N 3.32565°W

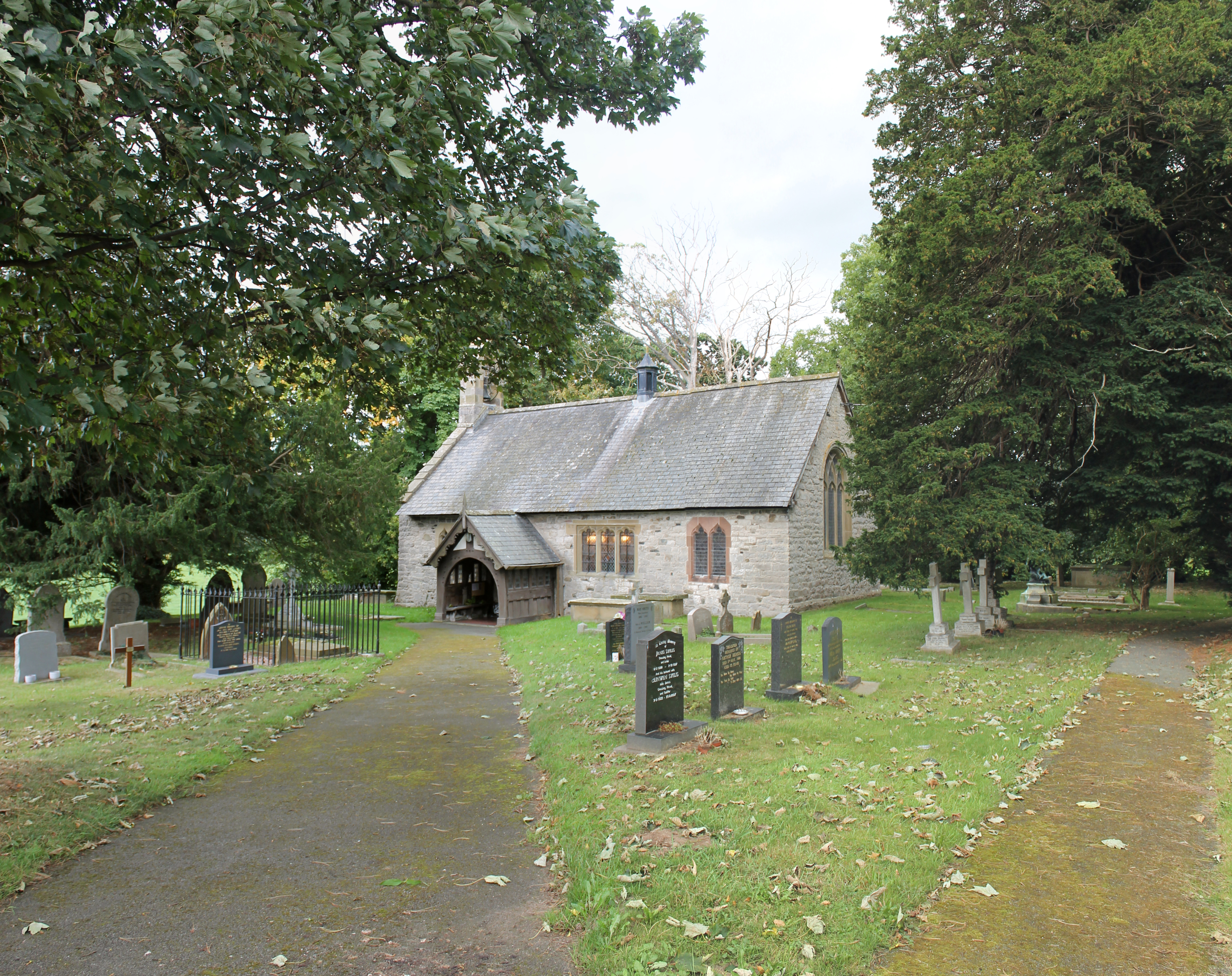
St Hychan's Church in Llanychan

Llanychan is a parish near Llandyrnog, Denbighshire, Wales. Covering 567 acres (2.29 km^{2}), it is the smallest parish in the diocese of St Asaph. It is approximately three miles north of Ruthin and is bounded to the west by the Afon Clwyd.

There are only two churches in Wales consecrated to Sant Hychan, who is said to have lived on the site in 450, and Llanychan Church (map ref. SJ114621), after which the parish is named, is one of them. It is mentioned in the Norwich Tax Records in 1254. Its notable features include a window dating from 1626, a reading desk from 1730, and a reredos from 1846. The church was extensively restored in 1878.

The church was registered Grade II with Cadw. The church roof has 16th century wooden beams.

The church is obscured from the main road by a red-brick rectory in front of it, and by a few residential buildings.

About half a mile south of the church is Plas Llanychan, a mansion built in 1880.

There was a school in the parish until the beginning of the 20th century.

== Noted person ==
Here was born Cyril Radcliffe, 1st Viscount Radcliffe, who became chairman of the committee that drew the new borders between India and Pakistan (West and East). In the violence that followed independence, it is believed that from hundreds of thousands up to two million people died, and millions more were injured.

He also chaired the committee which led to the Radcliffe report, which ultimately led to the creation of the National Girobank.
