= Bury St Edmunds County High School =

Location
- Beetons Way; Bury St Edmunds, Suffolk, IP32 6RF; England; 52°15′24″N 0°42′08″E

Information
- Type: Academy Converter
- Established: 1904
- Local authority: Suffolk
- Department for Education URN: 136990 Tables
- Ofsted: Reports
- Chairman of Governors: Ian Cox
- Headteacher: Sally Kennedy
- Staff: 91
- Gender: Coeducational
- Age: 11 to 19
- Enrolment: 992 pupils (209 in 6th Form)
- Houses: Jocelyn, Edmund
- Colour: Blue Gold
- Publication: The Courier, The Accolade
- Website: www.countyupper.org

Bury St Edmunds County High School, previously Bury St Edmunds County Upper School, is a 13 to 19 co-educational comprehensive part of the Bury St Edmunds All-Through Trust, comprising County High School, Horringer Court School, Westley School and Barrow CEVC and Tollgate Primaries.

It is one of three 13-18 schools serving the town of Bury St Edmunds in Suffolk, England and its surrounding villages. Pupils enter Year 9 primarily from three catchment middle schools in Bury St Edmunds but pupils are drawn widely from across the villages and towns of West Suffolk. The school is often over-subscribed with 266 first-choice applicants in 2009/10, 287 in 2010/11, 282 for 2011/12, 279 for 2012/13 and 268 for 2014/15 against a LEA Planned Admission Number of 260.

Attached to the main school is a Sixth Form, which at present stands at around 209 students spread between Years 12 and 13. The school is located on Beetons Way, on the outskirts of town, next to St Benedict's Roman Catholic Upper School, with which it used to collaborate in the sixth form. However, the sixth form will no longer exist after the 23–24 school year.

County High School has specialisms in science and languages with an Able and Talented Focus, and is also accredited as a "Consultant School" by the Specialist Schools and Academies Trust

Together with Westley School, part of the Bury St Edmunds All-Through Trust, it is the Area Hub for West Suffolk and East Cambridgeshire for the Computing at School Network of Excellence as part of the joint effort by the BCS, Chartered Institute for IT and the Computing Industry to provide leadership and strategic guidance to all those involved in Computing education in schools.

The school is accredited with the National College for School Leadership as a Teaching School and is part of the West Suffolk All-Through Teaching School Alliance, to train and develop teachers from September 2013 and it is also the lead Suffolk school in the Suffolk and Norfolk Initial Teacher Training (SNITT) initiative, in partnership with Suffolk County Council and University College Suffolk, which is part of the Department for Education's School Direct Training Programme.

In 2019, the school received an 'inadequate' inspection from Ofsted.

In 2023 due to the reorganization of four schools in Bury St Edmunds, the name of Bury St Edmunds County Upper School was changed to Bury St Edmunds County High School

== Organisation ==
As a school rated by Ofsted as "Outstanding" (1999, 2005, 2008, 2011, 2013), under the Academies Act 2010 County High School applied to become a High-Performing Academy – a publicly funded independent school.

Together with Horringer Court School, Westley School, Tollgate Primary School and Barrow Primary School, and working closely with Howard Middle School, it forms the 4-18 Bury St Edmunds All-Through Trust with the potential for students to move flexibly through the pyramid in accordance with their ability and aptitude allowing the six schools to work together strategically to drive up even further their standards and results.

The All-Through Academy Trust received the go-ahead from the Department of Education in September 2015 to create a Technical Academy alongside its traditional academic pathway offering 14-18-year-old students vocational education in Science, Technology, Mathematics and Engineering (STEM) working alongside industry to allowing a work-place based study. The Technical Academy plans to open in September 2017. Current industry and university partners include Microsoft, ARM, Bosch, British Sugar, Claas UK, BT, EDF, Marshall Aerospace, Rolls-Royce, Redgate Software, Treatt, UK Power Networks, Vitec, Suffolk Education Business Partnership and the University of East Anglia.

The Trust, in this instance led by County High, has become an Early Adopter of the World Class Schools Quality Mark.

== Origins ==
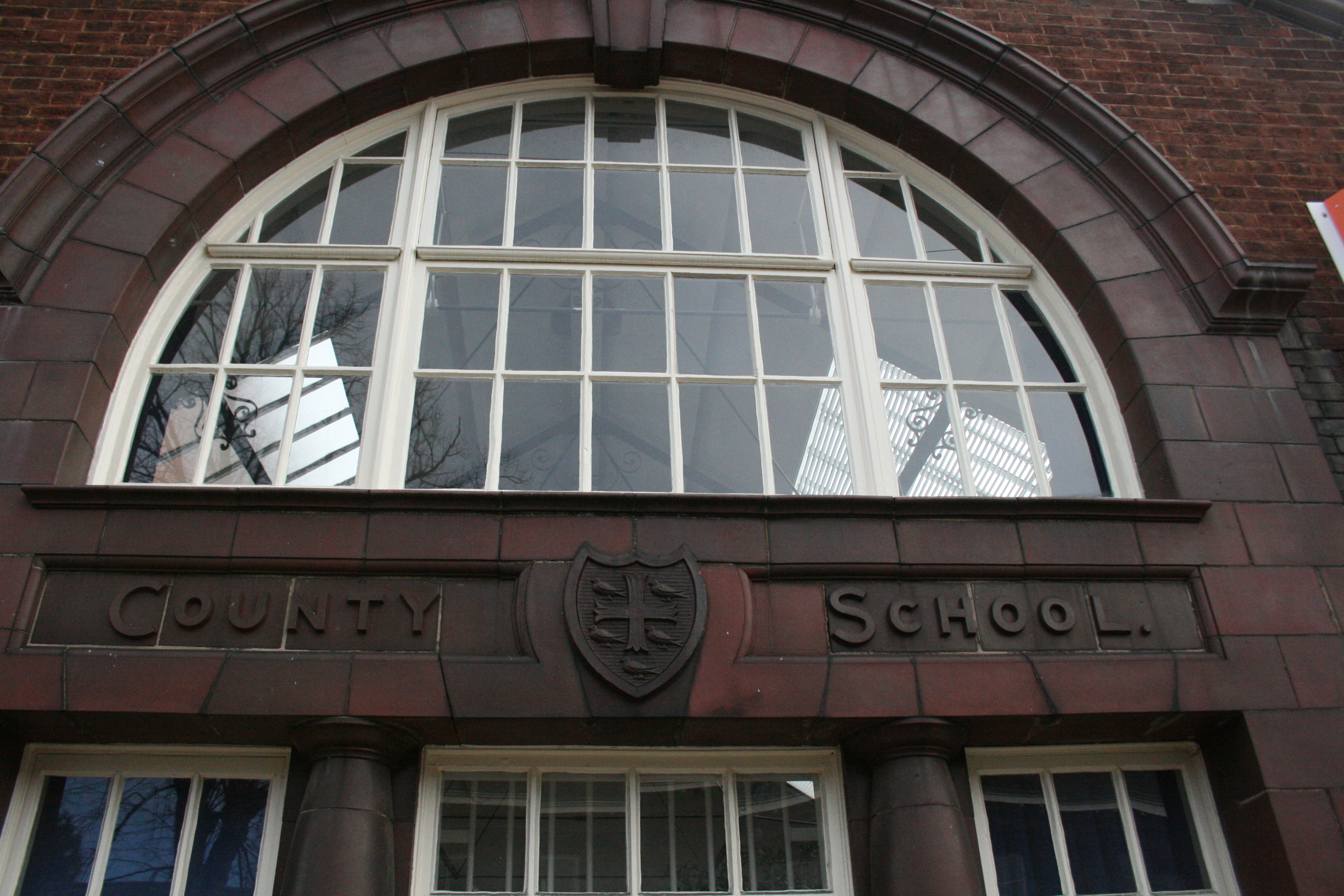
The original West Suffolk County School, Northgate Street, Bury St Edmunds

County High School traces its origins back to the Education Act 1902 that gave county councils the status of local education authorities, greatly expanding their powers and their expenditure. Within a few years it was normal for half a county's budget to be devoted to education and the West Suffolk County School was opened in Northgate Street in Bury St Edmunds. A large red brick building, the former Falconbury School and site of the original Northgate House, had been purchased for the purpose in 1904, then altered and improved. This original building was then extended in 1907. At this time it was co-educational (for both girls and boys), with separate playgrounds. In the early 1950s the school became the County Grammar School for Girls with eligible boys from Bury and its surrounding villages attending the King Edward VI Grammar School.

In 1964 the County Grammar School for Girls moved from its Northgate Street site to brand new premises at the end of Tollgate Lane (now known as Beetons Way) in north west Bury St Edmunds. For many years the girls had walked to this new site to make use of the playing fields that the local education authority had acquired there. These long walks now became unnecessary. The school premises in Northgate Street gradually became used as an annex to the West Suffolk College until 1988. Today, the old red brick building forms part of the Northgate Street Business Park, housing, amongst other enterprises, a dance school, a chiropractic clinic, the headquarters of the East of England Ambulance Service and the East of England Museums Libraries and Archives. In 1972 the County Grammar School for Girls became the co-educational and comprehensive County High School. The old single-sex state grammar school system, which separated children by gender and ability in Suffolk no longer exists.

The original West Suffolk County School coat of arms, seen above the old Northgate Street building entrance, consist of a gold cross fleury between five martlets on a blue shield and were the arms of Edward the Confessor, who in the 11th century granted land to the abbey of St Edmund, and those of the old West Suffolk County Council. The contemporary County High School coat of arms has four birds around a cross surmounted by the Saxon Crown of St Edmund, the last King of East Anglia. The blue sweaters with an all gold crest worn by today's pupils echo the colours of Edward the Confessor and are used by the school sports teams and on the school flag.

== Facilities ==
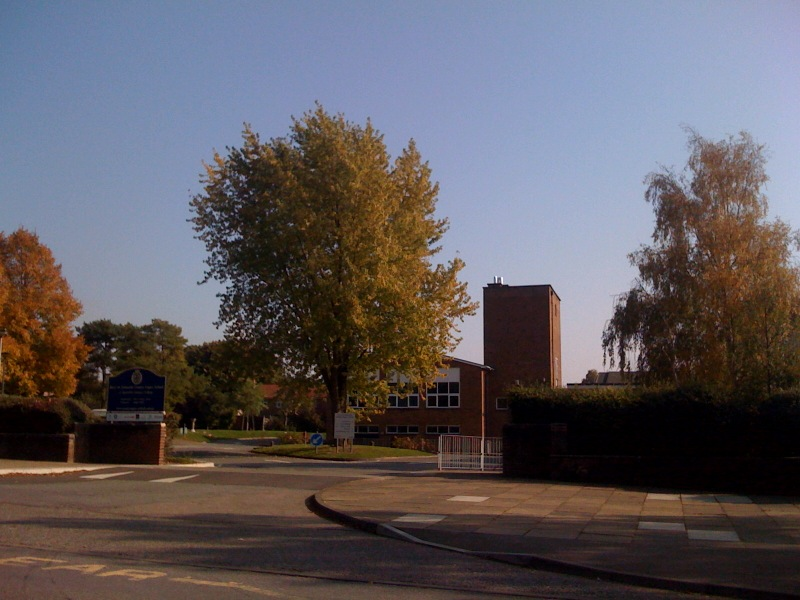
County High School, Bury St Edmunds today

The original girls' grammar school building, opened in 1964, provides the main teaching and administrative area. There are additional specialist facilities, built in the 1970s, to support the teaching of science, art and design technology. New facilities for humanities were built in the 1990s. In 2004 the school kitchens were refitted, and a new block containing a secondary eating area was created alongside a gym; above the eating area two classrooms were constructed, which are now the Sixth Form common rooms. This was extended in 2014.

A new library opened in October 2006, and a completely refurbished Performing Arts Centre opened Easter 2007 which contains facilities for dance, drama and music. This was dedicated to the memory of Michael Woodhouse, a pupil who use a wheelchair, who had unexpectedly died during Easter 2007. Work on new facilities for food technology and art were completed in summer 2008 which forms part of a visual arts centre, a business studies centre was completed during summer 2010, the science block was refurbished in summer 2011 and the main sports hall in summer 2012.

== Staff ==
Since 2021 the headmistress has been Sally Kennedy. Between 2005 and 2021, the school was led by Mrs Vicky Neale, following the retirement of Adrian Williams, who obtained a CBE for Services to Education after many years at the school. As of 2014, there are around 90 teaching staff. The most recent workforce statistics from the Department for Education indicates the academy's pupil-teacher ratio of 14.4:1 is lower than both the Suffolk LEA average of 16:1 in Secondary Schools and 15.7:1 for England as a whole.

== Ofsted inspections ==
The Ofsted inspection on 18–19 September 2013 rated County High School as Grade 1 - Outstanding for overall effectiveness and Grade 1 - Outstanding in all 4 inspection categories: Achievement of pupils; Quality of teaching; Behaviour and safety of pupils and leadership and management for both the main school and Sixth Form; its 8th successive "Outstanding" rating from Ofsted since 1998

The June 2013 Ofsted Report into the achievement of the top 30% most able pupils in non-selective comprehensive schools in England visited County High School and gave a Grade 1 "Outstanding" rating for all five categories it inspected: Transfer, transition and induction; Most able achievement; Teaching, learning and assessment; Curriculum; Support and guidance

The Education Act 2011 proposed that schools assessed as being Grade 1 "Outstanding" on their last inspection will not be subject to routine inspection unless concerns are raised with Ofsted about their performance. As with similar schools Ofsted wrote to County High School on 28 March 2011 with an "Interim Assessment" stating that based upon pupils' academic performance, very low rates of absence and having taken into account the results of survey visits carried out since the last routine inspection. they considered that the Outstanding performance had been sustained. Ofsted stated they would continue to undertake annual assessments of County High Schools' performance.

Following the most recent inspection in March 2019, County High School was downgraded to 'inadequate' by Ofsted following the failure of leaders to "ensure pupils' safety". It criticised the exposure of pupils to drug dealing and gang related activity; with reference to the criminal activity of students - absent at the time - being marked as present.

Pupils were quoted as saying they do not feel safe on the school site, with concern raised for the perceived ease of access of unauthorised visitors to gain access to the site.

== Academic achievements and attendance ==
County High achieved a 92% A*-C pass rate in the summer 2015 and 88% A*-C pass rate in the summer 2014 A-level examinations versus a national percentage of 76.5%. These both were the best state school A-level results in Suffolk topped only by Ipswich School.

County High Sixth Form students regularly achieve entry to Oxbridge colleges with an average of 6% of Sixth Form Pupils achieving entry to Oxford or Cambridge making it the 7th most successful non-selective school in England. Research by the Sutton Trust shows around three-quarters of students leaving Year 13 attend university after leaving County High, with one third attending the 30 most selective universities and colleges.

The 2015 and 2014 GCSE results showed similar success with 86% A*-C pass rates and 70% of students gained 5 or more A*-C passes including English and Mathematics compared with 55.5% for England nationally. The 2014 result was the joint second highest percentage awarded for a state school in Suffolk and joint highest in the Western Area together with neighbouring St Benedicts Roman Catholic High school.

42% of students achieved an A*-C pass rate in 2014 (compared with 22.9% nationally) for the GCSE subjects required to gain them the English Baccalaureate qualification, (English, Mathematics, 2 Sciences, History/Geography and a Modern Foreign Language) surpassing the 35% government target for that year.

Attendance in 2013 was recorded at 96.8% (2011 and 2012 were both 96.6%) compared with a national figure of 94.1% placing it in the first quintile of all schools in England and Wales and which is the highest attendance figure in Suffolk of any secondary school.

The 2014/15 Schools Guide rated County high as the best performing State Secondary school in the Bury St Edmunds area with the Westley and Horringer Court campuses of the All Through-Trust following close behind.

== Curriculum ==
=== Science ===
County High has a specialism in science with an Able and Talented focus. An Ofsted subject inspection in May 2009 judged the overall effectiveness of science to be outstanding with no areas for improvement.

It is the lead school in the Norfolk & Suffolk Science Learning Partnership promoting professional development amongst science education and learning professionals.

County High runs a Science and Engineering outreach programme including visits to universities and other science centres as well as workshops for able and talented pupils from feeder Middle Schools in West Suffolk. Year 9 Science pupils also participate in Science, Technology, Engineering and Mathematics (STEM) days run by the Smallpeice Trust promoting engineering careers for young people and lower school pupils participate in the new Go4Set STEM residential courses run by the Engineering Development Trust.

In summer 2010 the Specialist Schools and Academies Trust (SSAT) designated County High as a Consultant School in recognition of its assistance in helping other schools in Suffolk raise standards and achievement.

=== Languages ===
The school also has a specialism in languages with an Able and Talented focus.

The school offers Latin, French, German, Japanese, Russian and Spanish for all pupils with Italian in the Sixth Form. It runs an overseas exchange programme to Kyoto in Japan, the Ancona region of Italy, Guadalajara, Spain and the Rhineland area of Germany. The German exchange with the Amos Comenius School in Bonn is the longest running German exchange programme by a state school having started in 1967. The Japanese programme, one of the longest running in the Country, having started in 1970's with the exchange starting in 1985, involves annual language and scientific exchanges, summer camps and extensive cultural activities between Japan and Bury St Edmunds.

The school runs a Modern Foreign Language outreach programme with its feeder Middle Schools in West Suffolk where able and talented pupils take part in workshops and activity days hosted at County High during the course of the academic year.

=== Sport and physical activities ===
The school over 30 weekly extra-curricular sports clubs and activities, its facilities include a sports hall, gymnasium, a mini-sports hall, a fitness suite, a PE lab, six tennis and netball courts, two full-sized football pitches, cricket nets and a floodlit all-weather hockey/five-a-side football pitch all on site.

County high School won the 2011 BBC Look East School of the Year for Sport, was selected the Suffolk Sport "Secondary School of the Year" Award sponsored by Ipswich Town FC Community Trust in 2011, won the St Edmundsbury "School of the Year Award" for sport in both 2008 and 2011, gained the Association for Physical Education (afPE) Quality Mark with Distinction in autumn 2012 after being asked by the Association to help pilot the new scheme nationally, is partner school of both Sport England and the Youth Sport Trust via the Sportsmark Scheme and offers a wide variety of sport and team games. It has achieved the Football Association Charter Standard Secondary Development School status in recognition for the quality of its coaching. The school works with the East of England coach for British cycling and also fields an equestrian team.

School teams were the Suffolk U15 cricket and U16 netball champions for the 2010–11 season, the U17 rounders team reached the semi-finals of the English National Schools Championships in July 2011, and won the English National Golf Championships in July 2014.

The captain of Suffolk County Cricket team, Mr Justin Bishop, is a PE teacher and cricket coach for the school and Miss Heather Lymburn, also on the PE staff, is a member of the England Senior Korfball Squad.

==== County High Basketball Academy ====
In addition to the main school sports activities County High also hosts a dedicated Basketball Academy. The academy has its own Sports Director with pupils from across East Anglia attending the County high Sixth Form. Pupils are accommodated locally, attend the school and regularly enter regional and national-level competitions, tour the US and have achieved scholarships to US Basketball Colleges. The U17 Basketball Team were finalists and eventual runners-up in the English National School Championships in 2012.

=== Music, drama and visual arts ===
County High has achieved an Artsmark Gold award for its musical, dance and theatrical groups and events. The school is an accredited Arts Award Centre for the Trinity College London and Arts Council England scheme and an Examinations Centre for the Associated Board of the Royal School of Music and Rockschool. It also, together with Westley School from the Bury St Edmunds All-Through Trust, participates in the annual BBC School Report project run collaboratively between BBC News and BBC Learning giving young people an opportunity to make news reports.

The school staged one of the first amateur productions of the Phantom of the Opera in 2012 and other recent productions have included Les Miserables, West Side Story, Anything Goes, The Pyjama Game and "South Pacific". There have been three Swing Band tours of Suffolk Virginia USA together with music tours of Venice, Somerset and the Channel Islands.

== West Suffolk Music Centre ==
County High School hosts most of the Suffolk Youth Music activities in the Bury St Edmunds area on behalf of the Suffolk County Music Service. These consist of The Bury St Edmunds County Music School; the West Suffolk Youth Jazz Orchestra, Big Band, Ceilidh Band, Wind Band, Youth Orchestra and various instrumental classes.

== Awards and achievements ==
County High is recognised by Healthy Schools Suffolk and is accredited as an Investor in People. The English, Music and History Departments participate in the Prince of Wales' Prince's Teaching Institute Schools Programme to enhance the quality and breadth of the curricula including visits to Stratford, Berlin, Rome, the Somme battlefields and Auschwitz. The school received an International School Award in 2007, 2010 and 2013 from the British Council both for its strength in foreign language teaching and its scientific and cultural links with Europe, Japan and the USA.

== Notable former pupils and staff ==
=== West Suffolk County School ===
- Norah Lofts (1904–1983), best-selling British author.
- Richard Sidney Sayers (1908–1989), economist and historian specialising in the history of banking.
- Dora Holzhandler (1928–2015), French-born British painter specialising in the naive style.

=== Bury St Edmunds County High School ===
- Nicholas Frankau (b. 1952), actor best known for playing the role of Flt. Lt. Carstairs in the British sitcom 'Allo 'Allo!
- Alex Deane (b. 1979), writer, political commentator and consultant
- Justin Bishop (b. 1982), cricketer and PE teacher at the school
- Robin Kemp (b. 1984), cricketer and history teacher, and firs former deputy head at the school
