= Roger Parker (judge) =

British judge

The Right Honourable Sir Roger Parker

Lord Justice of Appeal
- In office 1983–1992

Justice of the High Court
- In office 1977–1983

Personal details
- Born: Roger Jocelyn Parker; 25 February 1923
- Died: 21 May 2011 (aged 88)
- Education: Eton College; King's College, Cambridge

Sir Roger Jocelyn Parker (25 February 1923 – 21 May 2011) was a British barrister and judge. He was a Lord Justice of Appeal from 1983 to 1992.

== Biography ==
=== Early life ===
Parker was the son of Captain The Honourable Trevor Tempest Parker, DSC, RN and Marieka Louise Leonie, née Kleinwort, of the Kleinwort banking family. Both his grandfather, Robert Parker, Baron Parker of Waddington, and his uncle, Hubert Parker, Baron Parker of Waddington, were senior judges.

Parker grew up in London and Sussex. He was educated at Eton College, before serving in the Rifle Brigade during the Second World War. Parker saw action in Italy and Austria, attained the rank of captain, and was mentioned in dispatches.

=== Legal career ===
After the war, he read law at King's College, Cambridge, and was called to the Bar at Lincoln's Inn in 1948. He joined the chambers of John Ashworth, a commercial set originally located at Three Hare Court, and later at One Hare Court alongside Henry Fisher, Patrick Neill, Gordon Slynn, and Richard Southwell. Parker built a large practice, mainly but not wholly commercial. Refusing an approach to become Treasury Devil in succession to Ashworth, he was instead appointed a Queen's Counsel in 1961, becoming the youngest QC. He was elected a Bencher of Lincoln's Inn in 1969 and was Treasurer of the Inn from 1990 to 1991.

Parker was Deputy Chairman of the Hertfordshire Quarter Sessions from 1969 to 1971 and a Judge of the Courts of Appeal of Jersey and Guernsey from 1974 to 1983. He was a member of the Bar Council from 1968 to 1969, Vice-Chairman from 1970 to 1972, and Chairman of the Bar Council from 1972 to 1973. He was Vice-President of the Senate of the Four Inns of Court from 1972 to 1973.

In the 1970s, Parker chaired two major public inquiries. From 1974 to 1975, he chaired the Court of Inquiry into the Flixborough disaster. In 1977, soon after he was appointed to the bench, he chaired the Windscale Inquiry into British Nuclear Fuels' application to develop reprocessing facilities for irradiated oxide nuclear fuels at Windscale.

=== Judicial career ===
Parker was appointed a Justice of the High Court in 1977, receiving the customary knighthood, and was assigned to the Queen's Bench Division. From 1981 to 1982 he was the Judge in charge of the Commercial List. In 1983, Parker was promoted a Lord Justice of Appeal and was sworn of the Privy Council. As a judge, he was outspoken about the service conditions of judges, which was rumoured to have prevented his promotion to the House of Lords. He retired in 1992.

== Family ==
Parker married Ann Elizabeth Frederika (née White) in 1948; they had one son and three daughters. They also cared for the three children of his wife’s brother and sister-in-law, who died in a plane crash in Peru.
