= Dora Holzhandler =

British painter (1928–2015)

Dora Holzhandler (22 March 1928 – 8 October 2015) was a French-born British painter based in London.

== Biography ==
Dora Holzhandler was born to Jewish-Polish parents (Sehia Holzhandler, handbag maker and Ruchla Rocheman a singer and seamstress) in Paris, France, and came to live in London when she was six years old.

In 1941 she moved to Suffolk with her mother and attended the West Suffolk County School in Bury St Edmunds.

She painted in the naive style, influenced by Marc Chagall and Henri Matisse. Her work often incorporates repeated iconography, mystical and religious symbolism influenced by her personal beliefs. She was discovered by artist Victor Pasmore in 1947 and had her first exhibition in 1954.

Her paintings are on display in the Museum of Modern Art in Glasgow, Scotland and the Jewish Museum London.

Holzhandler befriended violinist Nigel Kennedy in 2012 after inviting him to a gallery private view, later painting his portrait.

== Personal life ==
Holzhandler lived in London with her husband George Swinford, whom she married in 1950 after meeting at London's Anglo-French Art Centre.

She developed a dual belief in the Jewish and Buddhist faiths. She died on 8 October 2015 at the age of 87.
