= Pwllbach Colliery Co Ltd v Woodman =

- Court: Court of Appeal
- Citation: [1915] AC 634

Keywords
- Easements; landlord and tenant; tenant subject to those "existing" at time of grant; possible easement to create coal dust (a nuisance); whether common intention of landlord and tenant; whether coal screener generating dust necessary for mining to continue; whether implied easements for use in general and specific manner or for any conceivable manner

Pwllbach Colliery Co Ltd v Woodman [1915] AC 634 is an English land law case, concerning easements.

== Facts ==
Pwllbach Colliery sublet land in Glamorganshire from a tinplate company, whose memorandum authorised mining to be carried on. A neighbouring butcher, Mr Woodman, had a later lease from the tinplate company too, but ‘subject to all rights and easements belonging to any adjoining and neighbouring property’. He built a slaughter house and a sausage factory. Then the colliery erected a screening apparatus which threw up coal dust. Mr Woodman brought an action for nuisance.

The jury found there was a nuisance but the screening was reasonable and usual for the district, without negligence.

== Judgment ==
The House of Lords held the memorandum allowing carrying on the trade of mining did not authorise the nuisance, unless it could be proven that the trade could not otherwise be continued. There was no easement for making coal dust.

Earl Loreburn said it was unnecessary to answer whether creating coal dust could be an easement because the company was never authorised to do a nuisance.

Lord Parker said that the coal dust emission could be classified as an easement, but there was no common intention on which such an easement could be based. The first class consisted of easements of necessity. As to the second, he said this:

The second class of cases in which easements may impliedly be created depends not upon the terms of the grant itself, but upon the circumstances under which the grant was made. The law will readily imply the grant or reservation of such easements as may be necessary to give effect to the common intention of the parties to a grant of real property, with reference to the manner or purposes in and for which the land granted or some land retained by the grantor is to be used. .... But it is essential for this purpose that the parties should intend that the subject of the grant or the land retained by the grantor should be used in some definite and particular manner. It is not enough that the subject of the grant or the land retained should be intended to be used in a manner which may or may not involve this definite and particular use.

== See also ==
- English land law
- English trusts law
- English property law
