= Richard Sidney Sayers =

British economist

- Born: 11 July 1908; Bury St Edmunds
- Died: 25 February 1989 (aged 80); Eastbourne
- Occupations: Economist and historian
- Known for: Writing on the History of banking
- Spouse(s): Millicent E. Sayers née Hodson (after 1930) Audrey Taylor
- Children: a son and a daughter

Richard Sidney Sayers (11 July 1908, Bury St Edmunds — 25 February 1989, Eastbourne) was a British economist and historian specialized in the history of banking. He wrote on the development of monetary economics and British central banking.

== Early years and education ==
Richard Sidney Sayers was born as the fifth in a family of seven to Sidney James Sayers, an accountant for West Suffolk's county council, and his wife Caroline Mary Watson. He attended schools in Bury St Edmunds from 1912 to 1926, with two years at West Suffolk County School.

In 1926, Sayers entered St Catharine's College at Cambridge University and took first classes in both parts of the economics tripos. While there he befriended John Maynard Keynes and Dennis Robertson.

== Career ==
Sayers was appointed as assistant lecturer at the London School of Economics (LSE) in 1931 after completing his postgraduate studies at Cambridge University. He remained at LSE until 1935, when he became a lecturer at Oxford University, being made a fellow of Pembroke College in 1939.

During World War II, Sayers worked in the Ministry of Supply, and worked on uranium supplies. In 1945, James Meade asked Sayers to become deputy director of the Economic Section of the Cabinet Office, where Meade was director. They returned to academia in 1947, where Sayers became the Cassel Professor of Economics. He remained there until 1968.

In 1957 Sayers was appointed to the Committee on the Working of the Monetary System, i.e. The Radcliffe Report, where he examined most witnesses and drafted key section of the committee's official report. However, Sayers grew to be bitterly disappointed with the report's reception after it was published in 1959.

In addition to his academic work, Sayers was an editorial adviser of the Three Banks Review 1948–1968; it took its name from the original publishers, Royal Bank of Scotland with Williams, Deacon's Bank Limited and Glyn, Mills & Co., of the Three Banks Group. He was also associated with Economica. He was made a fellow of the British Academy in 1957 and held its vice presidency in 1966–67, and then worked from 1969 to 1974 as its publications secretary.

== Works ==
Sayers published numerous economic works, including a range of institutional histories. His works included:

- Bank of England Operations, 1890–1914 (1936)
- Modern Banking (1938). This was a popular textbook. Sayers emphasised the importance of liquidity. It was opinionated on bank rate and monetary policy.
- Financial Policy, 1939–45 (1956). The book became part of the official war history.
- Lloyds Bank in the History of English Banking (1957). A history of Lloyd's Bank.
- The Bank of England 1891–1944 (1976), an official history of the Bank of England, 2 vols. This history was completed in 1976 and earned Sayers the offer of a knighthood, which he refused.

Sayers also published essays and articles.

== Family ==
Sayers married in 1930 Millicent Hodson, daughter of William Henry John Hodson; she was a scholar and a translator. The couple had two children, a son and a daughter. The marriage wasn't happy. The couple separated in 1985, and Sayers lived with Audrey Taylor, a colleague of his, in Eastbourne.

== Sources ==
- Cairncross, Alec (1990). "Sayers, Richard Sidney, 1908-1989". Proceedings of the British Academy. Vol. 76. pp. 545–561. ISBN 0-19-726107-8.
