= Robin Kemp =

English cricketer and educator

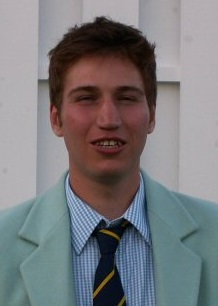

Personal information
- Full name: Robin Andrew Kemp
- Born: 29 September 1984 (age 42); Luton, Bedfordshire, England
- Batting: Right-handed
- Bowling: Right-arm medium
- Role: Bowler

Domestic team information
- Years: Team
- 2005–2008: Cambridge University
- 2007: Cambridge UCCE

Career statistics
Competition	First-class
Matches	5
Runs scored	17
Batting average	2.83
100s/50s	0/0
Top score	6
Balls bowled	636
Wickets	10
Bowling average	33.90
5 wickets in innings	0
10 wickets in match	0
Best bowling	3/23
Catches/stumpings	1/–
- Source: ESPNCricinfo, 2 December 2025

Robin Andrew Kemp (born 29 September 1984) is an English former cricketer and educator. He played in five first-class matches between 2005 and 2008, representing Cambridge University and Cambridge UCCE. Following his cricketing career, he became a teacher and school leader, serving in senior academic roles in the United Kingdom.

== Early life and education ==
Kemp was born in Luton, Bedfordshire, and educated at Bedford Modern School. He studied history at St John's College, Cambridge, graduating with a BA before completing an MPhil in modern European history.

== Cricket career ==
Kemp made his first-class debut in the 2005 University Match at Fenner's. He retained his place in the side for the following three years, appearing in the 2006, 2007, and 2008 matches. His only other first-class appearance came for Cambridge UCCE against Derbyshire in 2007.

A right-arm medium pace bowler, Kemp's best figures came in the 2008 University Match, where he took 3 wickets for 23 runs. Across his five first-class matches, he bowled 636 deliveries, claimed 10 wickets, and maintained a bowling average of 33.90.

== Professional career ==
After completing his studies, Kemp trained as a history teacher. He began his teaching career in Essex, working at Moulsham High School in Chelmsford, where he rose to the position of Deputy Headteacher. He later held senior leadership roles in Suffolk schools.

In September 2025, Kemp was appointed Deputy Head Academic at King's Ely, a co-educational independent school in Cambridgeshire.

== Legacy ==
While Kemp's cricketing career was modest in statistical terms, his repeated selection for the University Match highlights his standing within Cambridge cricket during the mid-2000s. His later career in education has seen him contribute to the leadership of several schools.

== See also ==
- Cambridge University Cricket Club
- University Match
