= Cyril Radcliffe, 1st Viscount Radcliffe =

British Viscount (1899–1977)

The Right Honourable The Viscount Radcliffe GBE PC FBA
- Lord Radcliffe in 1949

Lord of Appeal in Ordinary
- In office 1949–1964

Personal details
- Born: Cyril John Radcliffe; 30 March 1899 Llanychan, Denbighshire, Wales
- Died: 1 April 1977 (aged 78) Stratford-upon-Avon, Warwickshire, England
- Spouse: Antonia Mary Roby Benson (m. 1939)
- Education: University of Oxford

Cyril John Radcliffe, 1st Viscount Radcliffe, GBE, PC, FBA (30 March 1899 – 1 April 1977), was a British lawyer and Law Lord best known for his role in the Partition of India. He served as the first chancellor of the University of Warwick from its 1965 foundation until 1977.

== Education and early career ==
Radcliffe was born in Llanychan, Denbighshire, Wales, third of the four children — all sons — of Captain Alfred Ernest Radcliffe, of the King's Own Royal Regiment, and Sybil Harriet, daughter of solicitor Robert Cunliffe, President of the Law Society of England and Wales between 1890 and 1891.

Radcliffe was educated at Haileybury College. He was conscripted in World War I, allocated to the Labour Corps because of his poor eyesight. After the war, he attended New College, Oxford, and took a first in literae humaniores in 1921. In 1922, he was elected to a prize fellowship at All Souls College, Oxford. He won the Eldon Law Scholarship in 1923.

He was called to the bar by the Inner Temple in 1924, joining the chambers of Wilfred Greene, later the Master of the Rolls. He practised at the Chancery bar, and was appointed a King's Counsel in 1935.

During World War II, Radcliffe joined the Ministry of Information becoming its Director-General by 1941, where he worked closely with the Minister Brendan Bracken. In 1944, he was made a Knight Commander of the Order of the British Empire (KBE). He returned to the bar in 1945.

== Indian Boundary Committees ==
Radcliffe, a man who had never been east of Paris, was given the chairmanship of the two boundary committees set up with the passing of the Indian Independence Act. Radcliffe was tasked with drawing, within five weeks, borders for the new nations of Pakistan and India to leave as many Sikhs and Hindus in India and Muslims in Pakistan as possible. Radcliffe submitted his partition map on 9 August 1947, which split Punjab and Bengal almost in half. The new boundaries were formally announced on 17 August 1947 – two days after Pakistan's creation and two days after India became independent of the United Kingdom.

The resulting partition of India saw some 14 million people – roughly seven million from each side – flee across the border when they discovered the new boundaries left them in the "wrong" country. In the ensuing violence, between 200,000 to 2,000,000 people were killed, (Note: "The death toll remains disputed with figures ranging from 200,000 to 2 million.") and millions more were injured. After seeing the mayhem occurring on both sides of the boundary, Radcliffe refused his salary of 40,000 rupees (then 3,000 pounds). He was made a Knight Grand Cross of the Order of the British Empire in 1948.

Speaking of his experience as the chairman of boundary committees, he later said:

"I had no alternative, the time at my disposal was so short that I could not do a better job. Given the same period I would do the same thing. However, if I had two to three years, I might have improved on what I did."

The British-American poet W. H. Auden referred to Radcliffe's role in the partition of India and Pakistan in his 1966 poem "Partition".

== Later career ==
In 1949, Radcliffe was made a Lord of Appeal in Ordinary, by the title of Baron Radcliffe, of Werneth in the County of Lancaster, and was sworn of the Privy Council. Unusually, he had not previously been a judge. This was the last instance of a barrister being appointed to the highest court in the United Kingdom until Jonathan Sumption's appointment to the Supreme Court of the United Kingdom in 2012. In 1962, he was made a hereditary peer as Viscount Radcliffe, of Hampton Lucy in the County of Warwick.

In the 1940s and 1950s, he chaired a string of public enquiries and held numerous trusteeships, governorships, and chairmanships right up until his death, earning him the nickname "the Great Investigator." For example, he chaired the 1948 Committee of Enquiry into the Future of the British Film Institute, whose recommendations led to the post-war modernisation of the BFI. As a Law Lord, Radcliffe produced a 1956 proposal for a constitution for Cyprus that would grant self-determination to the British colony. His 1956 proposal sought to delay independence until the "Cyprus problem" of tensions between the island's Greek Cypriots and Turkish Cypriots was resolved. From 1957, he was chairman of the Radcliffe Committee, which investigated the United Kingdom's monetary and credit system. While the impact of the committee's Radcliffe report on monetary policy is debated, it spurred the creation of Girobank.

Radcliffe was also a frequent public speaker and wrote numerous books. For example, he gave the BBC Reith Lecture in 1951, a series of seven broadcasts titled Power and the State, which examined the features of democratic society and considered the problematic notions of power and authority. Radcliffe's 1960 talk for the Northwestern University Pritzker School of Law's Julius Rosenthal Foundation Lecture Series was published as The Law & Its Compass, which was positively reviewed for its defense of natural law. He also presented the Oxford University Romanes Lecture in 1963 on Mountstuart Elphinstone.

== Personal life ==
Lord Radcliffe married Antonia Mary Roby, daughter of Godfrey Benson, 1st Baron Charnwood, and former wife of John Tennant, in 1939. Radcliffe died in April 1977, aged 78. He had no children, making the viscountcy of Radcliffe extinct upon his death.

In 2006, two sets of Chancery barristers' chambers in Lincoln's Inn merged and adopted the name "Radcliffe Chambers."

== Arms ==
Coat of arms of Cyril Radcliffe, 1st Viscount Radcliffe
Coronet Coronet of a Viscount Crest [On a Wreath Argent and Sable] issuant from a Tower Or a Bull's Head Ermines Escutcheon Ermine four Bendlets engrailed Sable Supporters On either side a Black Labrador Retriever proper Motto Semper fidelis (Always faithful)

== See also ==
- Radcliffe Line for the Partition of India

== Notes ==
Academic offices
New university	Chancellor of the University of Warwick; 1965–1977	Succeeded by The Lord Scarman
Peerage of the United Kingdom
New creation	Viscount Radcliffe; 1962–1977	Extinct
