= Radcliffe report =

1959 report on monetary policy in the UK

The Report of the Committee on the Working of the Monetary System (commonly known as The Radcliffe Report) is a report published in 1959 about monetary policy and the workings of the Bank of England. It is named after its chairman, Cyril Radcliffe, 1st Viscount Radcliffe. The report started collecting evidence in 1957 and was the result of dissatisfaction with the workings of monetary policy in the 1950s. It is still an important reference document on the Bank of England.

== Context of creation ==
Monetary theory made progress after the interwar period but was disrupted by the Second World War. After the war, the context was adequate to start rethinking how to run monetary policy, and so the Radcliffe Committee was set up. The committee was composed of Lord Radcliffe, Professor Cairncross, Sir Oliver Franks, Viscount Harcourt, W. E. Jones, Professor Sayers, Sir Reginald Verdon Smith, George Woodcock and Sir John Woods.

== Contents ==
The 339-page report reviewed British monetary policy since 1931 and gave recommendations. The report downplayed the importance of keeping money supply within strict limits, as well the importance of monetary policy. In general, the report was a device for the government to get more control over the Bank of England, such as by suggesting that the Chancellor of the Exchequer be allowed to announce changes in the bank rate instead of the Bank of England.

== Aftermath and impact ==
The clear impact of the report on monetary policy is debated, and its actual influence on policy was limited. The economist Anna Schwartz, 10 years after the publication of the report, wrote that research in the following years gave "no support to the views expressed in the Radcliffe Report".

One of the main recommendations was that if neither the commercial banks nor the Trustee Savings Bank introduced a Giro system for mass banking, the General Post Office should investigate introducing such a system. In 1965 the new Labour Government published a white paper "A Post Office Giro", outlining such a system with a computerised central system for processing transactions. Subsequently National Girobank was created in 1968.
