= Robert Parker, Baron Parker of Waddington =

British judge and barrister (1857–1918)

The Right Honourable The Lord Parker of Waddington PC
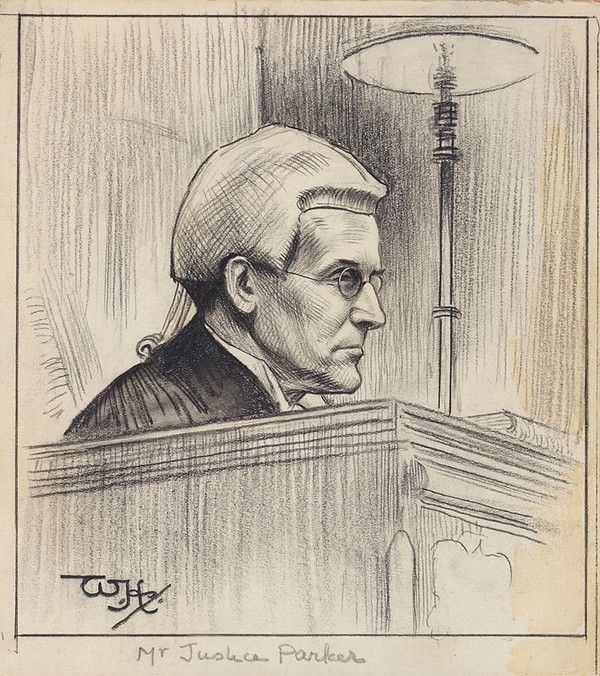
- Mr Justice Parker in 1906

Lord of Appeal in Ordinary
- In office 4 March 1913 – 12 July 1918
- Preceded by: The Lord Macnaghten

Justice of the High Court
- In office 24 October 1906 – 4 March 1913
- Preceded by: Sir Henry Buckley
- Succeeded by: Sir Charles Sargant

Personal details
- Born: 25 February 1857 Alford, Lincolnshire, England
- Died: 12 July 1918 (aged 61) Aldworth House, near Lurgashall, Sussex, England
- Spouse: Constance Barkley (m. 1884)
- Children: 5
- Education: King's College, Cambridge

Robert John Parker, Baron Parker of Waddington, PC (25 February 1857 – 12 July 1918) was a British judge who served as Lord of Appeal in Ordinary. He has been described as "one of the most esteemed judges of the early twentieth century."

== Early life and career ==
Born at Claxby Rectory, Alford, Lincolnshire, Parker was the son of the Reverend Richard Parker and of Elizabeth Coffin. His sister was the mental health worker Dame Ellen Pinsent. He was educated at Westminster School, Eton College (where he was a King's Scholar and Newcastle medallist), and King's College, Cambridge. At Cambridge he won the Browne Medal for Greek ode, and in 1880 was bracketed fifth in the first class of the classical tripos.

After taking his degree in 1880, Parker entered at Lincoln's Inn as a student and read in the chambers of Matthew Ingle Joyce. He was called to the bar in 1883 and remained in Ingle Joyce's chambers. In 1900, Ingle Joyce was appointed to the High Court, and Parker was selected by Lord Finlay to succeed Ingle Joyce as junior equity counsel to the Treasury, although he was unknown to the public. He never took silk.

== Judicial career ==
Parker was appointed a justice of the High Court in 1906, receiving the customary knighthood. Assigned to the Chancery Division, he rapidly acquired a judicial reputation, and sometimes sat as an additional judge of the Court of Appeal. He was especially known for his trial of patent cases, and settled the practice under the Patents and Design Act 1907. After delivering a judgement on the Marconi wireless telegraphy patents in 1913, he was invited to chair a technical advisory committee on wireless telegraphy, appointed to help the Postmaster-General to choose a system for the Imperial Wireless Chain. On 1 May 1913 the committee reported in favour of Marconi's system.

On 4 March 1913, Parker was chosen to succeed to Lord Macnaghten as Lord of Appeal in Ordinary, an unusually fast progress from the junior bar. He was created a life peer, taking the title of Baron Parker of Waddington, of Waddington in the County of York, and was sworn of the Privy Council on 7 March.

As an appellate judge, Parker had a high reputation, and was much concerned with the reputation and independence of the court. On one occasion, a politically fraught case came to the law lords, who divided 4 to 3 along party lines. Parker, who was in the minority, proposed to a judge in the majority that they should deliver each other's judgments, an offer which was refused. During the First World War, he sat on appeals from prize courts in the Judicial Committee of the Privy Council, and rapidly mastered the intricate practice in prize cases, without any previous experience in the field.

Parker also took part in public affairs. At the outbreak of the First World War, Parker lobbied privately ministers to introduce price controls, without success. He also spoke in the Lords, sometimes pressed by his friend Lord Curzon. In 1915, he spoke to the House of Lords about post-war reconstruction, and during the passage of the Representation of the People Act 1918 Parker (who had deputy high steward of the University of Cambridge since 1915) successfully pressed the Lords to allow women to vote in university constituencies even though they were disbarred from taking their degrees. On 19 March 1918, shortly before his death, Parker spoke on a motion by Lord Parmoor in favour of a League of Nations. Unable to read his handwriting due to failing light, Parker went to the table and read out a detailed scheme of twenty articles for the League's organisation.

His health failing, Parker carried on working until the summer of 1918, before he died on 12 July at Aldworth House, near Lurgashall, Sussex, the former residence of Lord Tennyson.

== Family ==
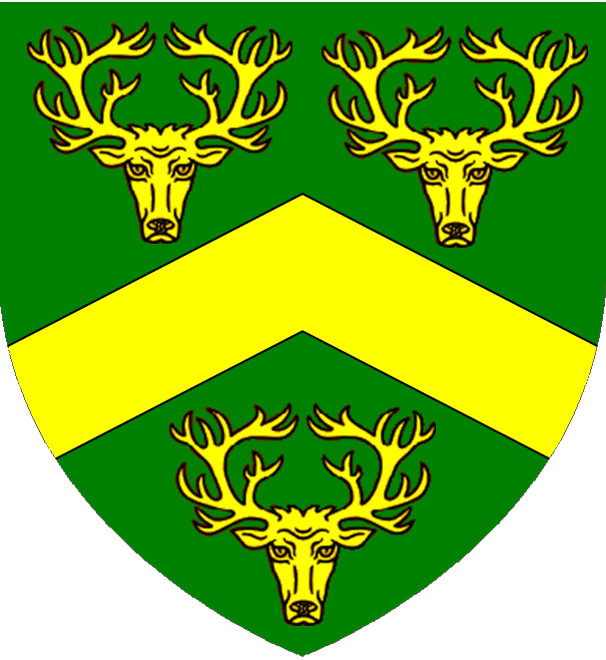
Shield of arms of Lord Parker of Waddington

On 9 September 1884 he married Constance Barkley, the daughter of a civil engineer; they had three sons and two daughters. One of his sons, Hubert Parker, Baron Parker of Waddington was Lord Chief Justice of England from 1958 to 1971, taking the same title as his father. A grandson, Sir Roger Parker, was a Lord Justice of Appeal.

The ancient Parker family seat is Browsholme Hall in the Forest of Bowland. Traditionally, the Parkers have served as Bowbearers to the Lords of Bowland.

== Selected judgments ==
=== High Court ===
- Johnson v Clark [1908] 1 Ch 303
- Lord Fitzhardinge v. Purcell [1908] 2 Ch 139
- Jones v Pritchard [1908] 1 Ch 630
- Manks v Whiteley [1911] 2 Ch 448

=== House of Lords and Privy Council ===
- Barry v Minturn [1913] AC 584
- Attorney-General of the Commonwealth v. Adelaide Steamship Co [1913] AC 781
- Kreglinger v New Patagonia Meat and Cold Storage Co Ltd [1914] AC 25
- Trim Joint District School Board of Management v Kelly [1914] AC 667
- Stickney v. Keeble [1915] AC 386
- Pwllbach Colliery Co Ltd v Woodman [1915] AC 634
- The Roumanian [1916] 1 AC 124
- The Zamora [1916] 2 AC 77
- Tamplin Steamship Co Ltd v Anglo Mexican Petroleum Co [1916] 2 AC 397
- Daimler Co Ltd v Continental Tyre & Rubber Co (Great Britain) Ltd [1916] 2 AC 307
- Admiralty Commissioners v SS Amerika [1917] AC 38
- Bowman v Secular Society Ltd [1917] AC 406
- Cotman v Brougham [1918] AC 514
- Banbury v Bank of Montreal [1918] AC 626
