= Hubert Parker, Baron Parker of Waddington =

British judge and Lord Chief Justice (1900–1972)

The Right Honourable The Lord Parker of Waddington PC
- 1968 photograph, by Godfrey Argent

Lord Chief Justice of England
- In office 30 September 1958 – 19 April 1971
- Nominated by: Harold Macmillan
- Appointed by: Elizabeth II
- Preceded by: The Lord Goddard
- Succeeded by: The Lord Widgery

Lord Justice of Appeal
- In office 1954–1958
- Appointed by: Queen Elizabeth II

Judge of the High Court of Justice
- In office 1950 – 19 April 1971
- Appointed by: Queen Elizabeth II

Personal details
- Born: Hubert Lister Parker; 28 May 1900
- Died: 15 September 1972 (aged 72)
- Parent: Robert Parker, Baron Parker of Waddington
- Education: Rugby School
- Alma mater: Trinity College, Cambridge
- Awards: Knight Bachelor; Life peer

Hubert Lister Parker, Baron Parker of Waddington, PC (28 May 1900 – 15 September 1972) was a British judge who served as Lord Chief Justice of England from 1958 to 1971. His term was marked by much less controversy than that of his predecessor, Lord Goddard.

The son of a law lord, Parker was educated at Rugby School and Trinity College, Cambridge. Having initially intended to go into business, he was instead called to the English bar in 1922, and specialised in commercial cases. In 1945, he was appointed Treasury devil and, after refusing promotion once, was appointed to the High Court in 1950, sitting in the King's Bench Division. He was promoted to the Court of Appeal in 1954. In 1957, he presided over the bank rate tribunal of inquiry.

== Family and early life ==
Parker was the son of Robert Parker, Baron Parker of Waddington, who had been a Lord of Appeal in Ordinary. He went to Rugby School (which he enjoyed; in later years he was Chairman of the Governors) and Trinity College, Cambridge. He graduated with a double first in Natural Sciences, specialising in geology and intending to go into the oil business. This intention he abandoned on graduating in 1922 to read for the Bar (Lincoln's Inn) where he was called in 1924, entering the chambers of Donald Somervell.

== Legal career ==
At the Bar, Parker specialised in commercial cases and developed a courtroom style that tried to be fair to all the arguments and make a case with calmness. In 1945, he became the Junior Counsel to the Treasury (Common Law) (also referred to as the "Treasury devil"), an appointment which normally led on to promotion to the High Court bench; however, when the invitation came from Lord Jowitt in 1948, Parker thought it was too soon and that he had only just become useful to the Treasury Counsel, and therefore declined. He accepted the second invitation when it came in 1950. As he went straight from being Treasury Devil to the High Court, he never 'took silk' (that is to say, he was not a King's Counsel): the Treasury Devil was never a 'silk'.

=== Judicial career ===
As a judge, Parker found himself presiding over trials in areas of the law he was unfamiliar with. He claimed that the first summing up which he gave in a criminal trial was the first he had ever heard. However, by getting down to the work, he eventually mastered the job and by 1954 was promoted to the Court of Appeal. The more measured style of the appellate courts suited Parker more than the cut and thrust of the King's Bench, and his ability to get to the important details of a case was assessed as good by those who appeared before him. He proved that he had reasonable political judgment in 1957 when heading a tribunal over a minor political scandal connected with the setting of interest rates.

==== As Lord Chief Justice ====
Lord Goddard announced his resignation as Lord Chief Justice in 1958. He had been an exception to the tradition that the Attorney General be appointed to the role and some commentators expected that the next appointment would therefore be Sir Reginald Manningham-Buller, Attorney-General at the time. However Manningham-Buller was widely disliked and also shared Goddard's reactionary views on criminal justice. Harold Macmillan considered Viscount Kilmuir, the Lord Chancellor, but Kilmuir rejected the job. Macmillan therefore decided to appoint a senior judge, and Parker's name emerged as the one candidate with whom most people were happy. On 30 September 1958, Parker took the title Baron Parker of Waddington, of Lincoln's Inn in the Borough of Holborn.

Parker's style was totally different from Goddard as he confined himself to the higher courts and did not intervene in everyday criminal trials. He had little interest in the social life of the judiciary. He was called upon where a trial had a serious political aspect, and was criticised when he imprisoned journalists who refused to reveal their sources during the Vassall tribunal of 1963. Parker's judgment stated in part "the citizen's highest duty is to the State". Parker also made history when he sentenced George Blake, convicted of spying, to 42 years imprisonment, the longest sentence then passed in an English court; the conjunction seemed to some to suggest that Parker was too close to the government of the day, though others said Parker had been shocked at the extent of the treachery that had sent dozens of Western agents to their deaths. Parker had himself said that the Courts "have a positive responsibility to be the handmaiden of administration rather than its governor".

However, Parker was popular among the profession as he secured improvements in judicial salaries and pensions. Parker was a mild reformer who supported legal aid and tried to modernise some judicial procedures which he thought were antiquated, such as the assize court system. Like Goddard, Parker took an active part in House of Lords debates. The most important speech he made was in debates during the passage of the War Damage Act 1965 which has the effect of retrospectively overturning the judicial decision of the House of Lords in Burmah Oil Co. v Lord Advocate thereby depriving the plaintiff of an award of damages. Parker regarded this as an abhorrent idea in principle, but his view did not carry the day. He supported moves to abolish the death penalty.

In 1964 Parker instituted the first 'Sentencing conference' to try to get consistency. In the late 1960s he introduced the first formal training for Judges, and welcomed the formation of the Law Commission. When Lord Beeching headed a committee looking at court reform in 1971, Parker's memorandum was more radical than the committee's recommendations.

== Death ==
Parker announced his retirement before the committee reported, and died the next year at the cattle farm he ran together with his wife of 48 years.

== Arms ==
Coat of arms of Hubert Parker, Baron Parker of Waddington
Crest A Stag trippant proper gorged with a Collar Vert Escutcheon Vert a Chevron between three Stags' Heads cabossed Or Motto Nec fluctu nec flatu movetur

Legal offices
Preceded by The Lord Goddard	Lord Chief Justice; 1958–1971	Succeeded by The Lord Widgery
