= Building Societies Association =

British finance trade association

- Formerly: Building Societies Protection Association (1869–1926)
- Industry: Financial services, Mutual sector
- Founded: 26 February 1869
- Headquarters: London, England, UK
- Area served: United Kingdom
- Key people: Robin Fieth (CEO)
- Website: www.bsa.org.uk

The Building Societies Association (BSA) is the trade body that represents all building societies and several large credit unions in the United Kingdom. It was established in 1869 under the original name Building Societies Protection Association, with the aim of coordinating a collective response to proposed government changes that threatened stamp duty exemptions for mutual lenders.

As of 2024, the BSA represents 49 member institutions, comprising 42 building societies and 7 credit unions, which together serve approximately 26 million customers across the UK.

The association advocates on behalf of its members in relation to financial services regulation, legislation, and policy developments in both the UK and Europe. It also provides research, public affairs support, and guidance for the mutual sector, with a focus on ensuring a sustainable and competitive environment for member institutions.

== Statistics ==
As of September 2024, UK building societies and their subsidiaries collectively held total assets amounting to approximately £525 billion. Their residential mortgage balances stood at over £395 billion, representing around 24% of the total outstanding mortgage balances in the United Kingdom.

In terms of savings, building societies held approximately £399 billion in retail deposits, accounting for about 19% of all such deposits in the UK. They also managed £153.9 billion in cash ISAs, around 40% of the total UK balance.

The building society sector collectively employed around 52,300 full and part-time staff and operated through approximately 1,300 branches, making up around 30% of the UK's total bank and building society branch network.

Among these institutions, the Nationwide Building Society is the largest. As of April 2024, it reported total assets of £271.9 billion, employed approximately 17,680 people, and operated 605 branches across the United Kingdom — more than any other UK banking brand.

== Members ==
The Building Societies Association (BSA) represents UK-based mutual lenders and deposit takers, including all 42 building societies and seven credit unions. It also encompasses certain subsidiaries and trading names of building societies. For instance, Virgin Money UK plc became a wholly owned subsidiary of Nationwide Building Society following its acquisition on 1 October 2024. As of May 2025, the BSA comprises 49 members: 42 building societies and 7 credit unions.

Name	Ref
Bath Building Society	
Beverly Building Society	
Buckinghamshire Building Society	
Cambridge Building Society	
Capital Credit Union	
Chelsea Building Society	
Chorley and District Building Society	
Co-operative Bank	
Coventry Building Society	
Cumberland Building Society	
Darlington Building Society	
Dudley Building Society	
Earl Shilton Building Society	
Ecology Building Society	
Family Building Society	
Furness Building Society	
Glasgow Credit Union	
Hanley Economic Building Society	
Harpenden Building Society	
Hinckley & Rugby Building Society	
Leeds Building Society	
Leeds City Credit Union	
Leek Building Society	
Leek United Building Society	
London Mutual Credit Union	
Loughborough Building Society	
Manchester Building Society	
Manchester Credit Union	
Mansfield Building Society	
Market Harborough Building Society	
Marsden Building Society	
Melton Building Society	
Monmouthshire Building Society	
National Counties Building Society	
Nationwide Building Society	
Newbury Building Society	
Newcastle Building Society	
No1 CopperPot Credit Union	
Norwich & Peterborough Building Society	
Nottingham Building Society	
Penrith Building Society	
Principality Building Society	
Progressive Building Society	
Saffron Building Society	
Scottish Building Society	
Scotwest Credit Union	
Skipton Building Society	
Stafford Building Society	
Suffolk Building Society	
Swansea Building Society	
Teachers Building Society	
Tipton & Coseley Building Society	
Vernon Building Society	
Virgin Money UK	
West Bromwich Building Society	
Yorkshire Building Society	

== See also ==
- List of European cooperative banks
