= City of Derry Building Society =

UK building society

- Type: Building Society (Mutual)
- Industry: Banking; Financial services
- Founded: 28 April 1876
- Defunct: 1 July 2014
- Fate: merged with Progressive Building Society
- Headquarters: Derry, Northern Ireland, UK
- Products: Savings, Mortgages, Investments, Loans, Insurance
- Website: www.cityofderrybs.co.uk

The City of Derry Building Society was a UK building society based in Derry, County Londonderry, Northern Ireland, known until 2001 as the Londonderry Provident Building Society. It was a member of the Building Societies Association.

== History ==
The society was founded as the Londonderry Provident Building Society on 28 April 1876. It was the smaller of just two building societies based in Northern Ireland, the other being Belfast's Progressive Building Society.

The society had only one office, its current Carlisle Road premises which it moved to in 1993. At that time, it was the smallest UK building society with only £5 million in assets, growing to just £12 million by 2000.

In 1996, it became so popular due to coming near the top of savings rate league tables, that it temporarily refused new business from outside Northern Ireland. In 2006, the society was still restricting membership to local residents.

The name change to City of Derry Building Society in 2001 was prompted in part by earlier vandalism of the society's sign due to the Derry/Londonderry name dispute; it was opposed by local unionist politician, Gregory Campbell. The society was one of 12 institutions that did not sign up at the launch of the 2001 revised banking code.

It merged with the Progressive Building Society on 1 July 2014.
