= Stroud & Swindon Building Society =

UK building society

Coventry Building Society trading as Stroud & Swindon Building Society
- Company type: Building Society (Mutual)
- Industry: Banking; Financial services
- Founded: 1850
- Fate: Merged with the Coventry Building Society
- Headquarters: Stroud, England, UK
- Key people: John Sutherland, Chief Executive
- Products: Savings, Mortgages, Investments, Loans, Credit Cards, Insurance
- Total assets: £2.7 billion GBP (31 December 2009)
- Number of employees: 350+
- Website: www.stroudandswindon.co.uk

Stroud & Swindon Building Society was the 10th largest building society in the United Kingdom, with headquarters in Stroud, Gloucestershire and total assets of £2.7 billion as at 31 December 2009. It was a member of the Building Societies Association until its merger with the Coventry Building Society in 2010.

== History ==
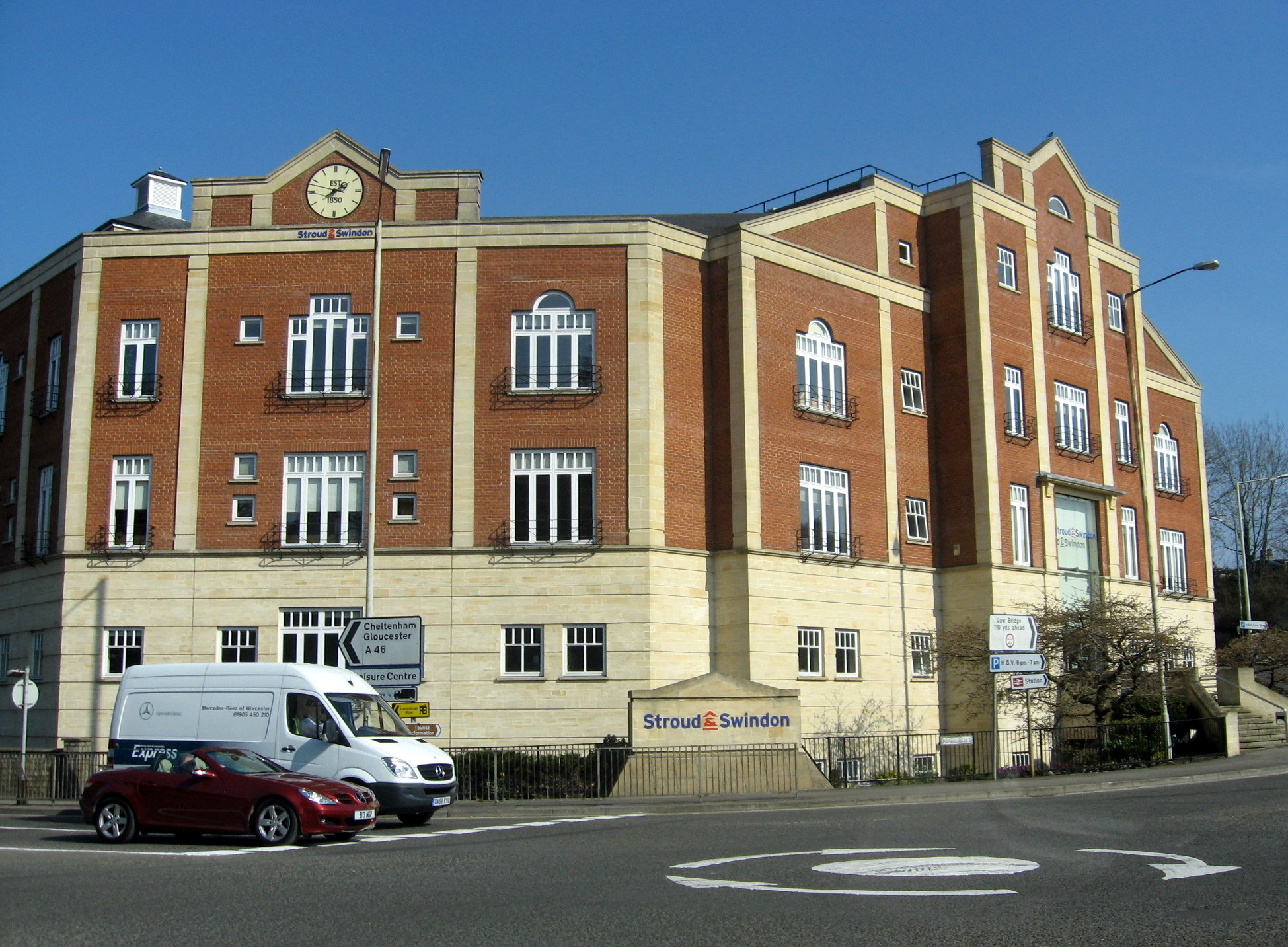
Former headquarters of the Stroud & Swindon in Rowcroft, Stroud

Stroud and Swindon Building Society was originally established as the Stroud Provident Benefit Building Society in 1850.

The first head office was in Rowcroft in Stroud where the offices of Winterbothams solicitors are now and, indeed, Lyndsey Winterbotham was the first chairman. After transferring for a period to larger premises in Russell Street, the Society moved in 1990 to a purpose built head office, less than 200 yards (180 m) away from the original location.

Over the years a series of acquisitions of other societies including the Bristol Permanent Building Society and the Frome and Selwood Building Society saw the Stroud Building Society develop and grow. Merger with the Swindon Permanent Building Society in 1986 led to the change of title of Stroud & Swindon.

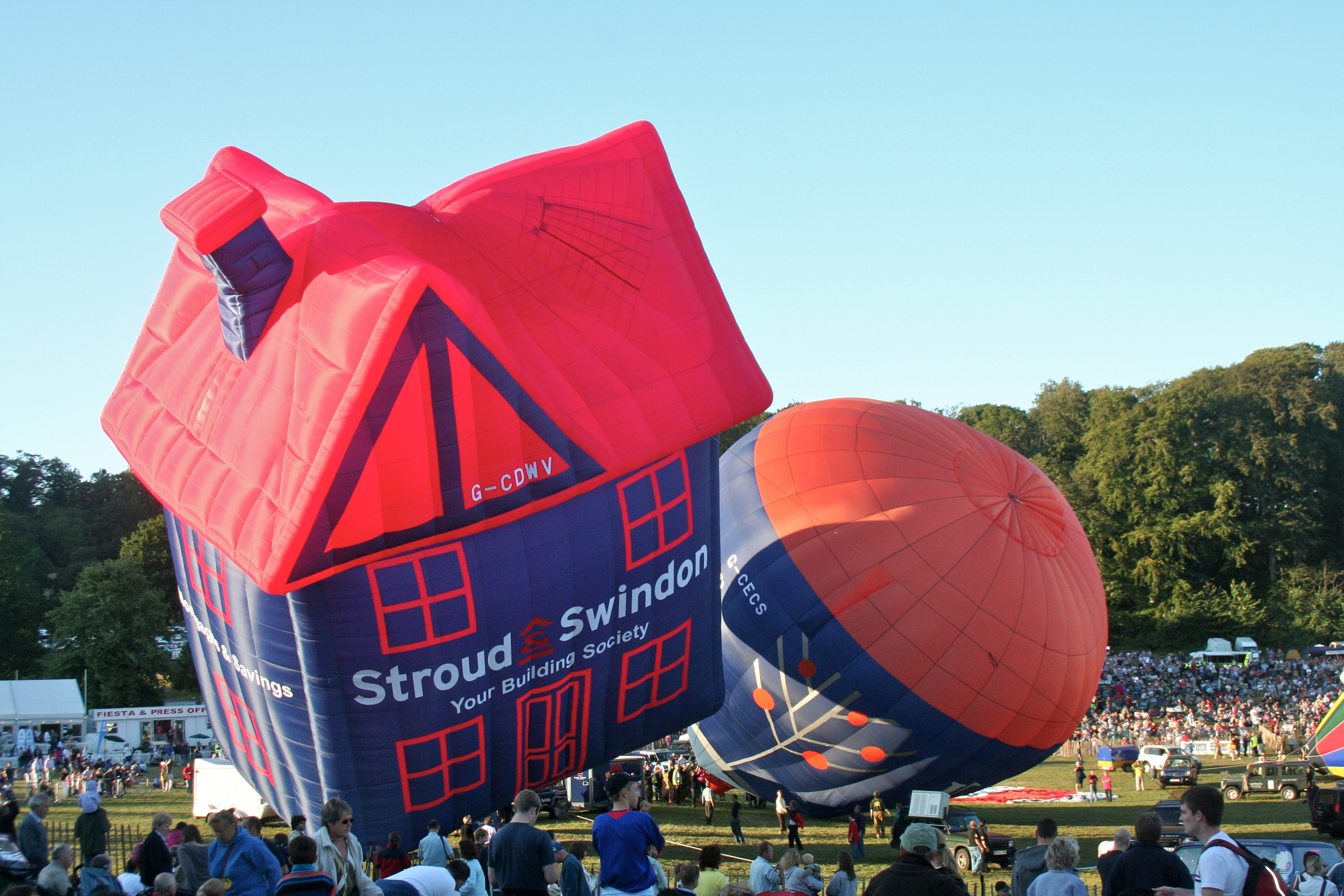
A balloon advertising Stroud & Swindon

The Stroud & Swindon merged with the Coventry Building Society on 1 September 2010 following an announcement on 23 March and the approval of members on 16 June. The Stroud and Swindon name continued for a year as a separate and distinct brand. However, the head office functions transferred to Coventry immediately.
