= Hendon Building Society =

- Type: Building Society (Mutual)
- Industry: Financial services
- Founded: c.1886 as a terminating society 1926 as a permanent building society
- Defunct: 1991
- Fate: Acquired by the Bradford & Bingley Building Society
- Products: Savings, Mortgages

Hendon Building Society was a UK building society, which was founded in 1926. It was acquired by the Bradford & Bingley Building Society in 1991.

== Starr-Bowkett Society ==
The Hendon Building Society had its roots in a previous Hendon Building Society, the 697th Starr-Bowkett Society, founded around 1886. It was a terminating society which were gradually outlawed by statute between 1900 and 1910, which opened the path to a permanent building society of the same name. The last terminating society, the First Salisbury and District Perfect Thrift Building Society wound up in 1980.
