= Darlington Building Society =

British building society

- Type: Building Society (Mutual)
- Industry: Banking; Financial services
- Founded: 1856
- Headquarters: Darlington, England, UK
- Number of locations: 9
- Products: Mortgages, Investments
- Total assets: ▲£833 million (2022)
- Number of employees: 186 (2022)
- Website: www.darlington.co.uk

Darlington Building Society is a UK building society, which has its head office in Darlington, County Durham, England. It reported assets of £833 million in 2022 and is a member of the Building Societies Association.

== History ==
The society was formed in 1856.

In 2021, it was named building society of the year, after investing heavily in digital banking, working with UK based IT company IeDigital.

Every year it donates 5% of its profits to local good causes, supporting mental health, climate, poverty, loneliness and developing skills for the unemployed.
