= Teachers Building Society =

- Type: Building Society (Mutual)
- Industry: Banking; Financial services
- Founded: 1966
- Headquarters: Wimborne, Dorset, England.
- Key people: Julie Nicholson – Chair; Simon Beresford – Chief Executive
- Products: Mortgages, Savings, Insurance
- Number of employees: Around 50
- Website: www.teachersbs.co.uk

Teachers Building Society is a mutual British financial institution founded in 1966 by the National Union of Teachers (now the National Education Union). It is a member of the Building Societies Association.

== History ==
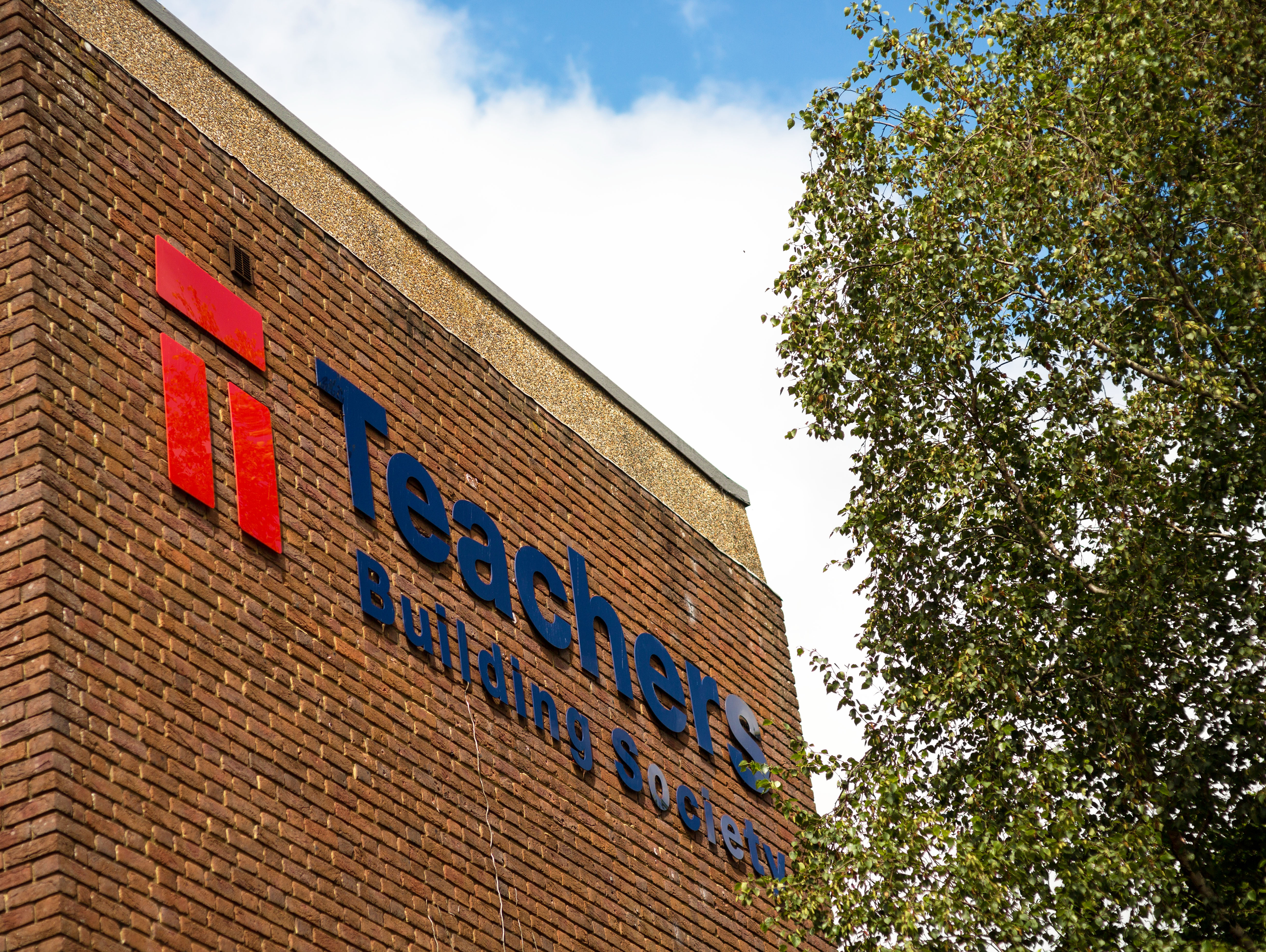
Teachers Building Society headquarters in Wimborne, Dorset

The society was formed in order to help its teacher members onto the property ladder, when the National Union of Teachers acquired the London Scottish Building Society, in 1966.
