= Shepshed Building Society =

- Company type: Building Society (Mutual)
- Industry: Banking; Financial services
- Founded: 1879
- Fate: Merged with Nottingham Building Society, 2013
- Headquarters: Shepshed, England, UK
- Products: Savings, Mortgages, Investments, Loans, Insurance
- Website: www.thenottingham.com

The Shepshed Building Society was a UK building society, which had its head office in Shepshed, Leicestershire. It merged with the larger Nottingham Building Society on 1 July 2013. The three former Shepshed branches rebranded under Nottingham's name.
