= Vernon Building Society =

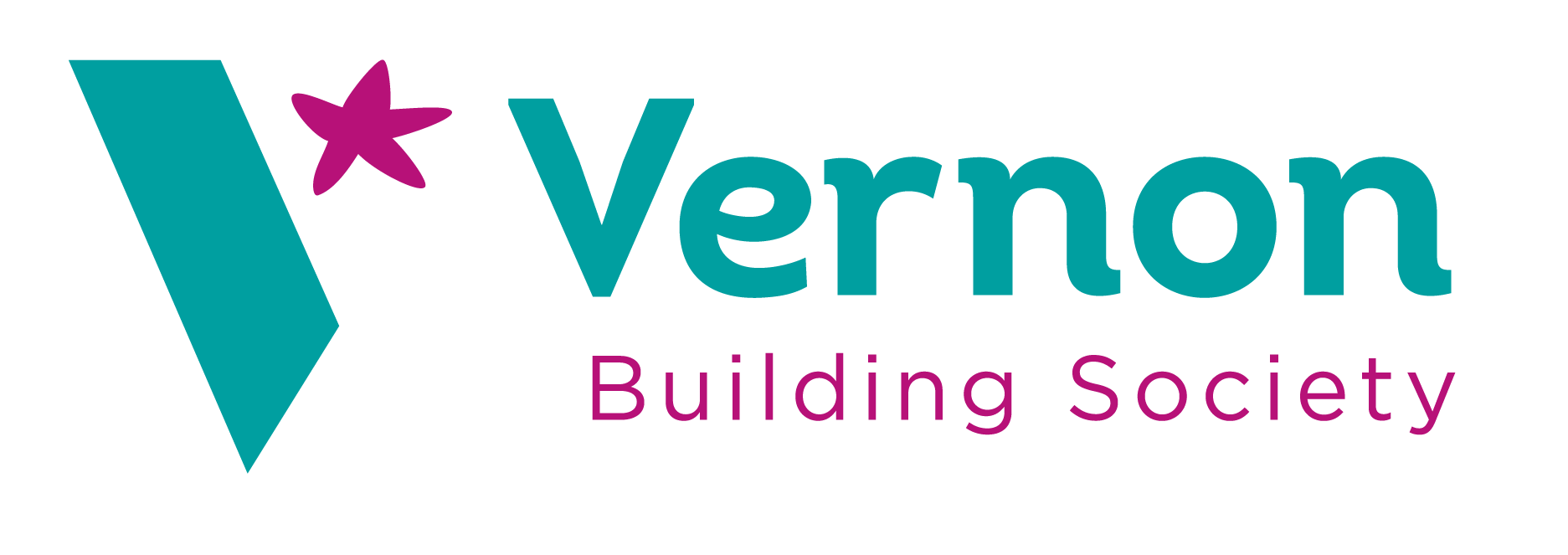
- Type: Building Society (Mutual)
- Industry: Banking; Financial services
- Founded: 1924
- Headquarters: Stockport, England, UK
- Number of locations: 6
- Key people: Chief Executive - Steve Fletcher
- Products: Savings, Mortgages and Insurance
- Revenue: £5.1 million GBP (year ended December 2015)
- Total assets: £299.7 million GBP (December 2015)
- Total equity: £20.1 million GBP (December 2015)
- Website: www.thevernon.co.uk

The Vernon Building Society is a building society based in Stockport, England. It is a member of the Building Societies Association.

It was named after George John Warren (Lord Vernon), who donated land which became Vernon Park and Vernon Mill in Stockport, so as not to conflict with the names of the other 12 building societies in the town. It started trading in 1924.
