= Harpenden Building Society =

English building society

- Company type: Building Society (Mutual)
- Industry: Banking; Financial services
- Founded: 3 March 1953
- Headquarters: Harpenden, Hertfordshire, England
- Area served: United Kingdom
- Key people: Chairman - Stephen Richardson CEO - Richard Doe
- Products: Savings, Mortgages, Investments
- Net income: £1.0 million GBP (December 2015)
- Total assets: £307 million GBP (December 2015)
- Website: www.harpendenbs.co.uk

The Harpenden Building Society is an English building society, which has its Head Office in Harpenden, Hertfordshire. It is the 38th largest in the United Kingdom based on total assets of £315 million at 31 December 2017. It is a member of the Building Societies Association.

== History ==
The society was formed in 1953. An agency office (now closed) was opened in Stopsley in Luton in 2008; in September 2010 a fourth branch opened in Wendover, with a fifth in Tring in January 2011 and sixth in Buckingham in March 2011. The Wendover and Buckingham branches were closed in 2020, explaining they were the "smallest and least utilised branches".

In 2015, 2016, and since 2017, each year it has won the What Mortgage Award for Best Local Building Society.

== Cultural references ==
The Harpenden Building Society is mentioned in The Poems of Ewen McTeagle, in Monty Python's Big Red Book (1971).
