= Marsden Building Society =

British building society

- Company type: Building Society (Mutual)
- Industry: Banking; Financial services
- Founded: 1860
- Headquarters: Nelson, Lancashire, England
- Number of locations: 8
- Products: Savings, Mortgages, Investments, Loans, Insurance
- Website: themarsden.co.uk

The Marsden Building Society is a British building society, with its headquarters in Nelson, Lancashire. It is a member of the Building Societies Association, a trade organisation of building societies in the United Kingdom. The society was established in 1860. In 2019, the society's assets exceeded £500 million for the first time. It launched a new workplace savings scheme in June 2025.
