= Earl Shilton Building Society =

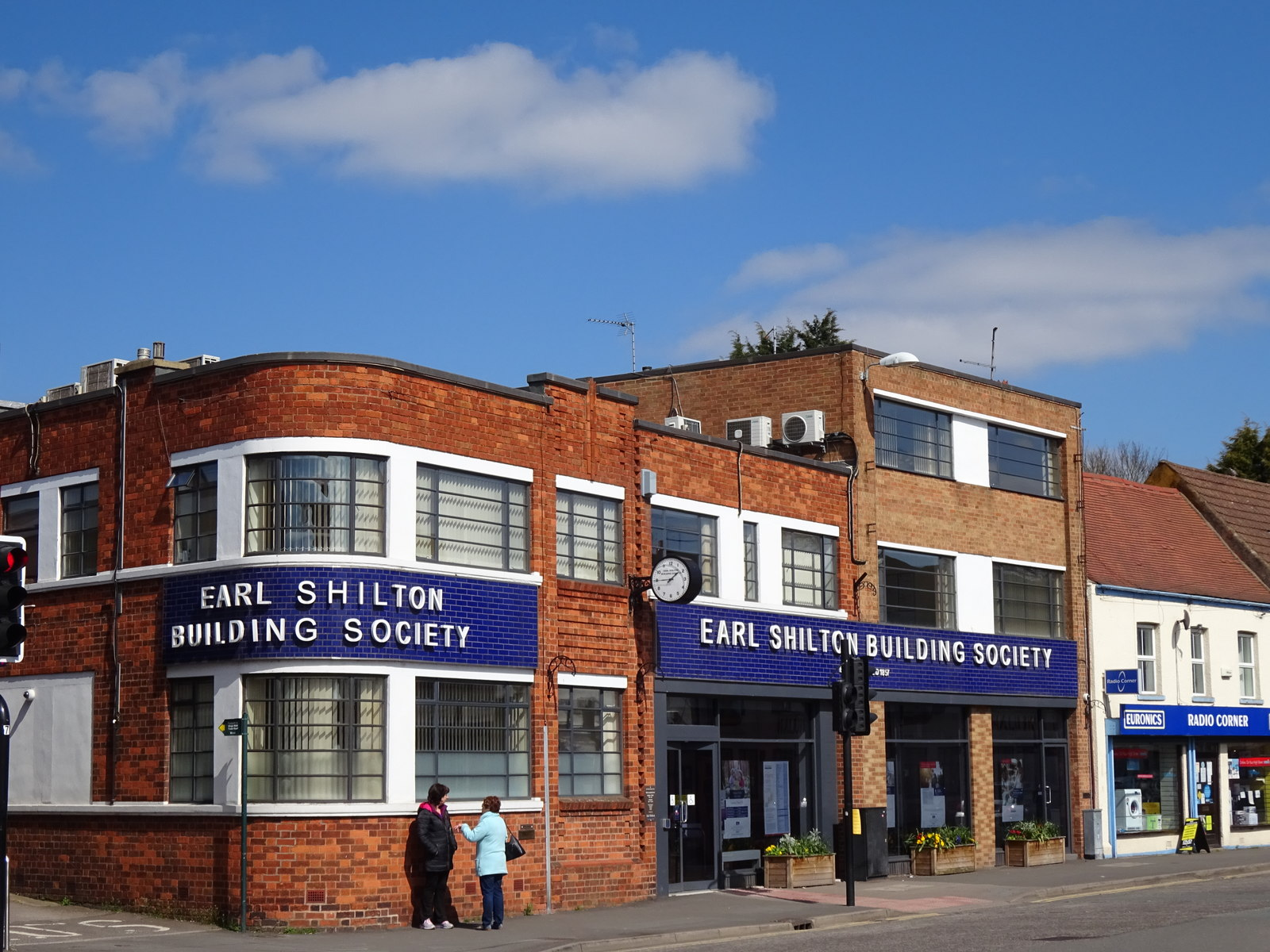
- Branch in Earl Shilton, Leicestershire, UK
- Type: Building Society (Mutual)
- Industry: Banking; Financial services
- Founded: 3 January 1857
- Headquarters: Earl Shilton, Leicestershire, England
- Number of locations: 2
- Area served: United Kingdom
- Key people: Chairman: Alex Robinson; Chief Executive: Scott Devereux; Deputy Chief Executive & Finance Director: Stephen Wigfull
- Products: Savings, Mortgages
- Total assets: ▲£183 million GBP (March 2025)
- Members: ▲13,358 (March 2025)
- Number of employees: 40 (March 2025)
- Website: esbs.co.uk

The Earl Shilton Building Society is a British building society, which has its head office in Earl Shilton, Leicestershire. It is the second-smallest in the United Kingdom based on total assets of £183 million as at 31 March 2025. The society has a branch in Barwell too. It is a member of the Building Societies Association. The society was established in 1857.
