= Mansfield Building Society =

The Mansfield Building Society
- Type: Building Society (Mutual)
- Industry: Banking; Financial services
- Founded: 1870
- Headquarters: Mansfield, England
- Number of locations: 4
- Key people: Chief Executive - Paul Wheeler
- Products: Savings, Mortgages, Insurance and Financial Advice
- Number of employees: 90+
- Website: mansfieldbs.co.uk

The Mansfield Building Society is a UK building society, which has its headquarters in Mansfield, Nottinghamshire. It is a member of the Building Societies Association. The society was established in 1870 and, as of September 2012, had total assets of over £250 million. In September 2024, it entered into a contract with Tata Consulting Services to replace its core banking software.
