= Leek United Building Society =

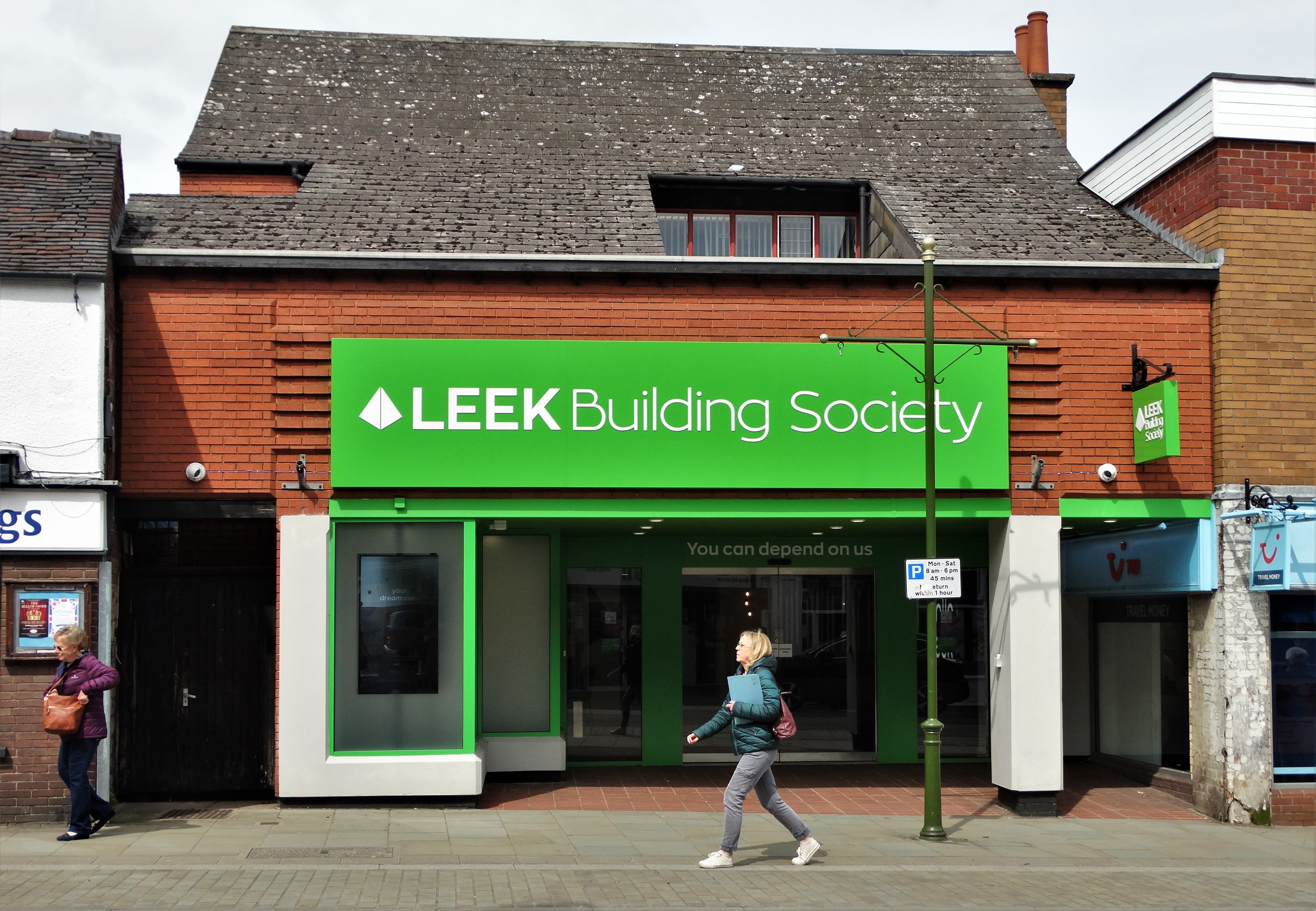
- Branch in Leek, Staffordshire
- Type: Building society (mutual)
- Industry: Banking and financial services
- Founded: 1 January 1863
- Headquarters: Leek, Staffordshire, England, UK
- Number of locations: 12
- Key people: Andy Deeks (chief executive)
- Products: Savings, mortgages, investments, loans, insurance
- Total assets: £1,313.9 million GBP (December 2023), 6.1% on 2022
- Number of employees: 182 (2023)
- Website: www.leekbs.co.uk

Leek United Building Society, trading as Leek Building Society, is an independent mutual building society based in Leek, Staffordshire, England. It is the 17th largest building society in the UK, based on total assets of £1,313.9m as at 31 December 2023. It is a member of the Building Societies Association.

== History ==
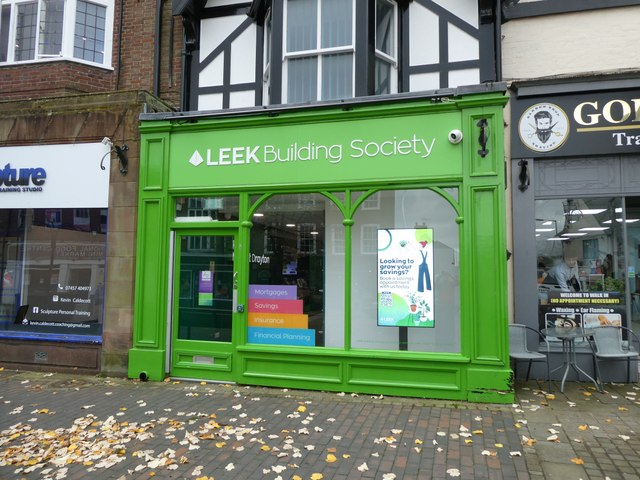
Branch in Market Drayton, Shropshire

The society was established as the Leek United Permanent Benefit Building Society on 1 January 1863, under the motto 'Firm and Lasting (as the pyramids)'.

In 1999, Leek Building Society was the target of a hostile takeover bid by Murray Financial Corporation, an Edinburgh-based financial group, which tabled a £30.5 million bid for the society. The bid failed, however, when the society's members rejected the offer.
