= Market Harborough Building Society =

- Type: Building Society (Mutual)
- Industry: Banking; Financial services
- Founded: 1870
- Headquarters: Market Harborough, England
- Number of locations: 6
- Key people: Chief Executive - Iain Kirkpatrick
- Products: Savings and Mortgages
- Total assets: £541 million GBP (2021)
- Number of employees: 128
- Website: mhbs.co.uk

The Market Harborough Building Society is a UK building society, which has its headquarters in Market Harborough, Leicestershire. It is a member of the Building Societies Association. The society was established at The Square in Market Harborough in 1870. Newly refurbished offices for the society were opened in March 2024.
