= Holmesdale Building Society =

- Type: Building Society (Mutual)
- Industry: Banking; Financial services
- Founded: 1855
- Fate: Taken over by the Skipton Building Society in 2018
- Headquarters: Reigate, England
- Number of locations: 1
- Key people: Joanne Hindle (Chairman); Dean Fensome (Chief Executive); Mike McDermott (Secretary)
- Products: Savings and Mortgages
- Total assets: £184 million GBP (March 2018)
- Members: 7,443 (March 2017)
- Website: theholmesdale.co.uk

The Holmesdale Building Society was a single-branch UK building society based in Reigate, Surrey. It was a member of the Building Societies Association.

== History ==
The society was founded by Thomas Buckland, a local earthenware dealer and estate agent, in 1855. It was acquired by the Skipton Building Society in October 2018.
