= Universal Building Society =

UK building society

- Type: Building Society (mutual)
- Industry: Banking and Financial services
- Founded: 1863
- Defunct: 2006
- Fate: Acquired by Newcastle Building Society
- Headquarters: Newcastle upon Tyne, England, UK
- Products: Savings and Mortgages

Universal Building Society was a UK building society with headquarters in Newcastle upon Tyne that operated between 1863 and 2006. It was merged with the Newcastle Building Society in 2006.

== History and merger ==
The building society was established in Newcastle upon Tyne in 1863. In 2004, it funded a sculpture which was established outside Seven Stories, the National Centre for Children's Books, in Newcastle.

In 2006, it merged with the Newcastle Building Society. At the time of the merger, the Universal was the 29th largest building society in the UK with assets of £600m.
