= Beverley Building Society =

Financial institution based in Beverley, England

- Type: Building Society (Mutual)
- Industry: Banking; Financial services
- Founded: 1866
- Headquarters: Beverley, England
- Number of locations: 1
- Area served: United Kingdom
- Key people: Chief Executive – Janet Bedford; Chair – Karen Wint
- Products: Savings and Mortgages
- Net income: ▲£1.23 million GBP (December 2023)
- Total assets: ▲£206 million GBP (December 2023) ▲£192 million GBP (December 2016)
- Number of employees: 34 (2023)
- Website: beverleybs.co.uk
- Footnotes; Beverley Building Society. "2023 Annual Report" (PDF).

The Beverley Building Society is a British building society based in the East Riding of Yorkshire town of Beverley and founded in 1866.

Its only branch is on Saturday Market in Beverley, though from 1998 to 2009 it had a second branch in Pocklington. It is the third-smallest in the United Kingdom based on total assets of £174 million as at 31 December 2011.

It is a member of the Building Societies Association and is the only independent building society in the East Riding of Yorkshire. The building society offers a range of savings accounts and one mortgage package with three levels of discount.

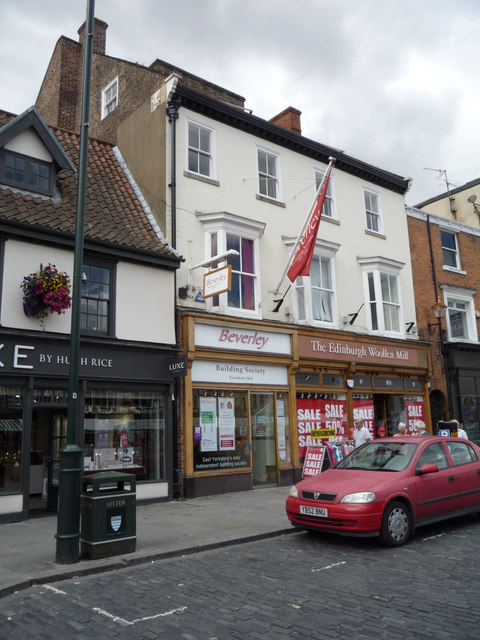
Beverley Building Society's sole branch on Saturday Market, shown in 2017 in the former branding.
