= Progressive Building Society =

Financial institution in the United Kingdom

- Company type: Building Society (mutual)
- Industry: Banking and financial services
- Founded: 1914; 112 years ago
- Headquarters: Belfast, Northern Ireland, UK
- Number of locations: 11
- Key people: Keith Jess (chairman); Michael Boyd (chief executive)
- Products: Savings, Mortgages, Investments
- Revenue: ▲£28.6 million (2022)
- Operating income: ▲£9.2 million (2022)
- Net income: ▲£7.9 million (2022)
- Total assets: ▲£1,900.2 million (2022)
- Total equity: ▲£149.5 million (2022)
- Number of employees: 172 (2022); 176 (2021)
- Website: www.theprogressive.com

The Progressive Building Society is a building society in the UK. The Society was founded in Belfast in 1914, and operates 11 branches across Northern Ireland. It is a member of the Building Societies Association. At December 2022, the Society had total assets of more than £1.9 billion. In July 2014, it merged with the City of Derry Building Society.
