= Newbury Building Society =

- Type: Building Society (Mutual)
- Industry: Banking and financial services
- Founded: 1856
- Headquarters: Newbury, Berkshire, UK
- Number of locations: 10
- Key people: Phillippa Cardno, Chief Executive
- Products: Savings, Mortgages
- Total assets: £1.54bn GBP (October 2023)
- Number of employees: 180-190
- Website: www.newbury.co.uk

Newbury Building Society is a building society headquartered in Newbury, Berkshire in the south of England. It is a member of the Building Societies Association. It was established in 1856. The society entered into a contract with Sopra Banking Software to provide a new app in April 2024.
