= Cumberland Building Society =

Financial institution in the United Kingdom

- Branch in Keswick, Cumbria
- Type: Building society (mutual)
- Industry: Banking; Financial services
- Founded: 16 April 1850
- Headquarters: Carlisle, England, UK
- Number of locations: 34
- Key people: John Hooper (chair); Des Moore (chief executive)
- Products: Financial services; Insurance; Investments; Loans; Mortgages; Savings
- Revenue: ▲£84.4 million (2023)
- Operating income: ▲£26.6 million (2023)
- Net income: ▲£21.6 million (2023)
- Total assets: ▲£3,090.1 million (2023)
- Total equity: ▲£226.6 million (2023)
- Number of employees: ▼634 (2023); 584 (2022)
- Website: Official website

Cumberland Building Society, trading as The Cumberland, is a building society in the UK, with its headquarters in Carlisle, England. It is a member of the Building Societies Association.

The Cumberland was established on 16 April 1850 as the Cumberland Co-operative Land and Benefit Building Society. It is the 10th largest building society in the United Kingdom based on total assets of more than £3 billion as at 31 March 2023.

In 2014 the Cumberland became the first UK building society to offer a mobile payments service linked to a mobile phone number, called Pay2Mobile. It became part of the national Paym mobile payments service later that year.

== History ==
The Cumberland has its origins as one of the freehold land societies common at the time. The format was pioneered in 1847 by the Birmingham Freehold Land Society and one of the noted exponents was the National Building Society in 1849 (better known as one half of the Abbey National). The Cumberland was launched as the Cumberland Co-operative Land and Benefit Building Society in 1850.

As with the National, it was required to remove “Land” from its legal name as a requirement of registration under the Benefit Building Societies Act 1836. However, at its first AGM, the Society still referred to itself as The Cumberland Freehold Land Society. The formation of the Cumberland was associated with the “forty shilling freeholders movement” (whereby voting rights could be secured by the possession of freehold land with an annual value of £2) although the emphasis of the inaugural publicity and meetings was on the benefits of co-operative purchase and development of land. One of the declared objectives of the Society was “to supply at wholesale prices, allotments of freehold land, adapted to confer a vote for the county – such allotment to be paid for by small weekly subscriptions.” Having bought the land, the Society carried out all the functions of a developer, laying out streets, providing sewerage, fencing etc. selling the serviced plots to individuals at the wholesale price. Within weeks of its formation, the Society had 1260 members and by the end of the year it had acquired two estates, Edentown and Belle View.

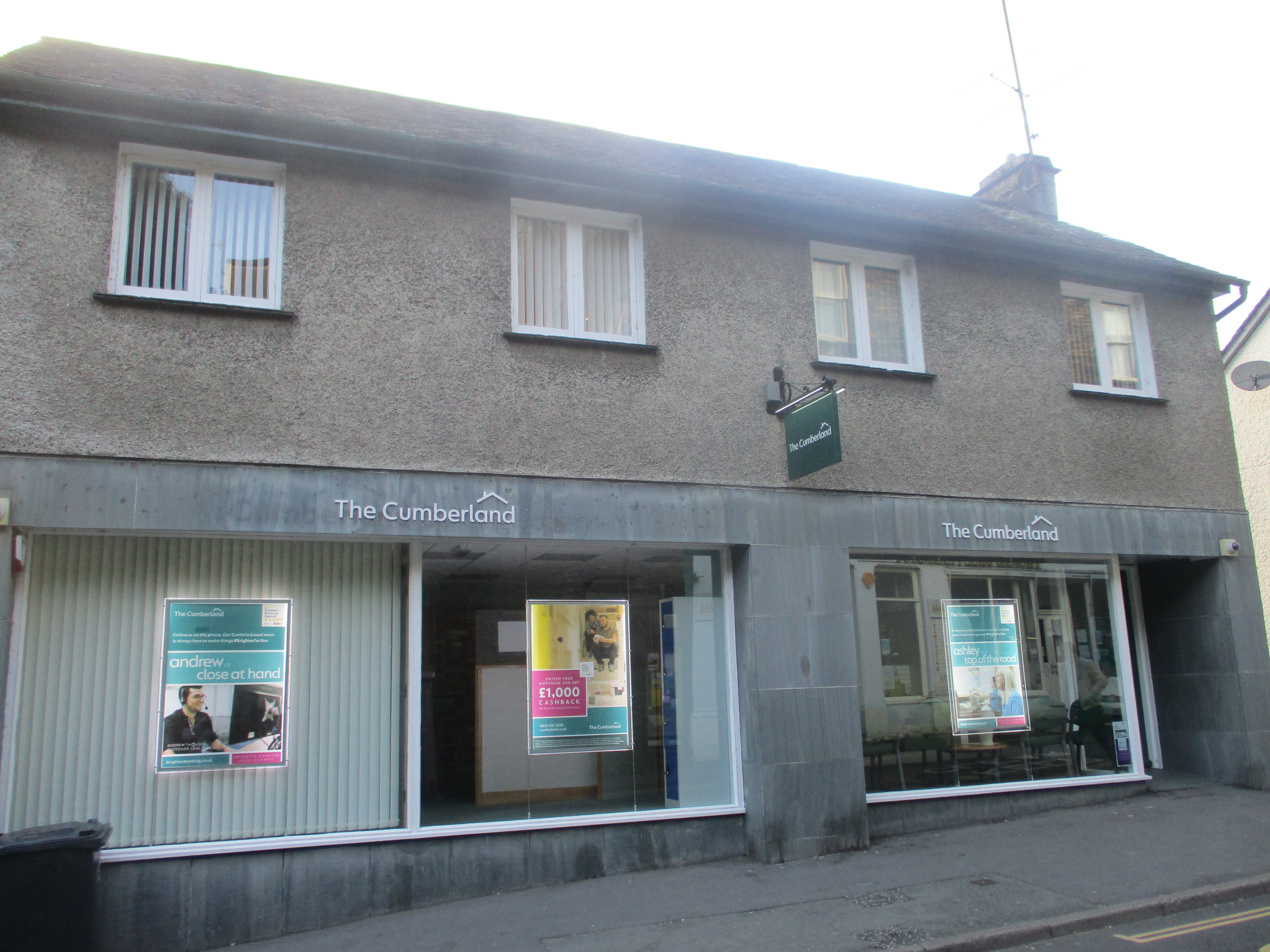
Cumberland Building Society branch in Ambleside.

It opened an office in Lancaster in January 2013.
