= Dudley Building Society =

- Type: Building Society (Mutual)
- Industry: Banking; Financial services
- Founded: 1858
- Headquarters: Dudley, England, UK
- Number of locations: 6
- Products: Savings, Mortgages, Investments, Loans, Insurance
- Members: 30,918 (March 2014)
- Number of employees: 91
- Website: www.dudleybuildingsociety.co.uk

The Dudley Building Society is a UK building society, which has its head office in Brierley Hill, West Midlands. It is a member of the Building Societies Association. The society was established in 1858. It opened a pop-up bank in Shifnal, in September 2025.
