= Penrith Building Society =

- Company type: Building Society (Mutual)
- Industry: Banking; Financial services
- Founded: 1877
- Headquarters: Penrith, England
- Number of locations: 1
- Area served: Westmorland and Furness, Cumberland
- Key people: Chairman - Will Lindsay; Chief Executive - Tim Bowen; Finance Director - Elspeth James
- Products: Savings, Mortgages, Insurance
- Total assets: ▲£138 million GBP (December 2022)
- Members: ▼6965 (December 2022)
- Number of employees: 26 (2022); 26 (2021)
- Website: www.penrithbs.co.uk

Penrith Building Society is a British building society based in Penrith, England. It is a member of the Building Societies Association. The society was established in 1877. It has operated from an office in King Street since 1969.
