= Newcastle Building Society =

Financial institution in the United Kingdom

- Type: Building Society (mutual)
- Industry: Banking and Financial services
- Founded: Newcastle Permanent Building Society (1863); Newcastle Building Society (1980)
- Headquarters: Newcastle upon Tyne, England, UK
- Number of locations: 31
- Key people: The Hon. James Ramsbotham CBE DL (chair); Andrew Haigh (chief executive)
- Products: Savings, Mortgages, Investments, Insurance
- Revenue: ▲£119.7 million (2022)
- Operating income: ▲£31.7 million (2022)
- Net income: ▲£26.0 million (2022)
- Total assets: ▲£5,312.5 million (2022)
- Total equity: ▲£245.9 million (2022)
- Number of employees: ▲1,393 (2022); 1,284 (2021)
- Website: Official website

Newcastle Building Society is the eighth largest building society in the UK, with its headquarters in Newcastle upon Tyne, England. It is a member of the Building Societies Association. At December 2022, the Society had total assets of more than £5 billion.

== History ==
The Society in its current form was formed in 1980 as a result of a merger between the Grainger (founded 1861) and Newcastle Permanent Building Societies (founded 1863).

After 16 years at Grainger as Chief Executive and Managing Director, Phillip Langley-Essen was appointed the first Executive Head of the Newcastle Building Society (NBS) in 1980. Even designing its logo, Essen was influential in the formation of the NBS in the six years he was working at the society.

In 2006, it merged with another Newcastle-based society, the Universal Building Society. Two years later it opened a new office at Cobalt Business Park in North Tyneside.

In February 2011, it announced that it planned to lend more to the North East's housing market. Ten months later, Wirecard AG of Germany acquired Newcastle Building Society's prepaid card issuing activities in six European countries.

In February 2023 it was confirmed that the society had agreed to merge with the Manchester Building Society. The merger was completed in July 2023.
