= National & Provincial Building Society =

Defunct building society of the United Kingdom

- Type: Building Society (Mutual)
- Industry: Financial services
- Founded: 1982
- Defunct: 1996
- Fate: Acquired by the Abbey National
- Products: Savings, Mortgages

The National & Provincial Building Society was a mutual building society based in Bradford, England. It was established in 1982 by a merger between the Provincial Building Society and the Burnley Building Society.

On 5 August 1996, Abbey National took over the National & Provincial.

== Headquarters ==
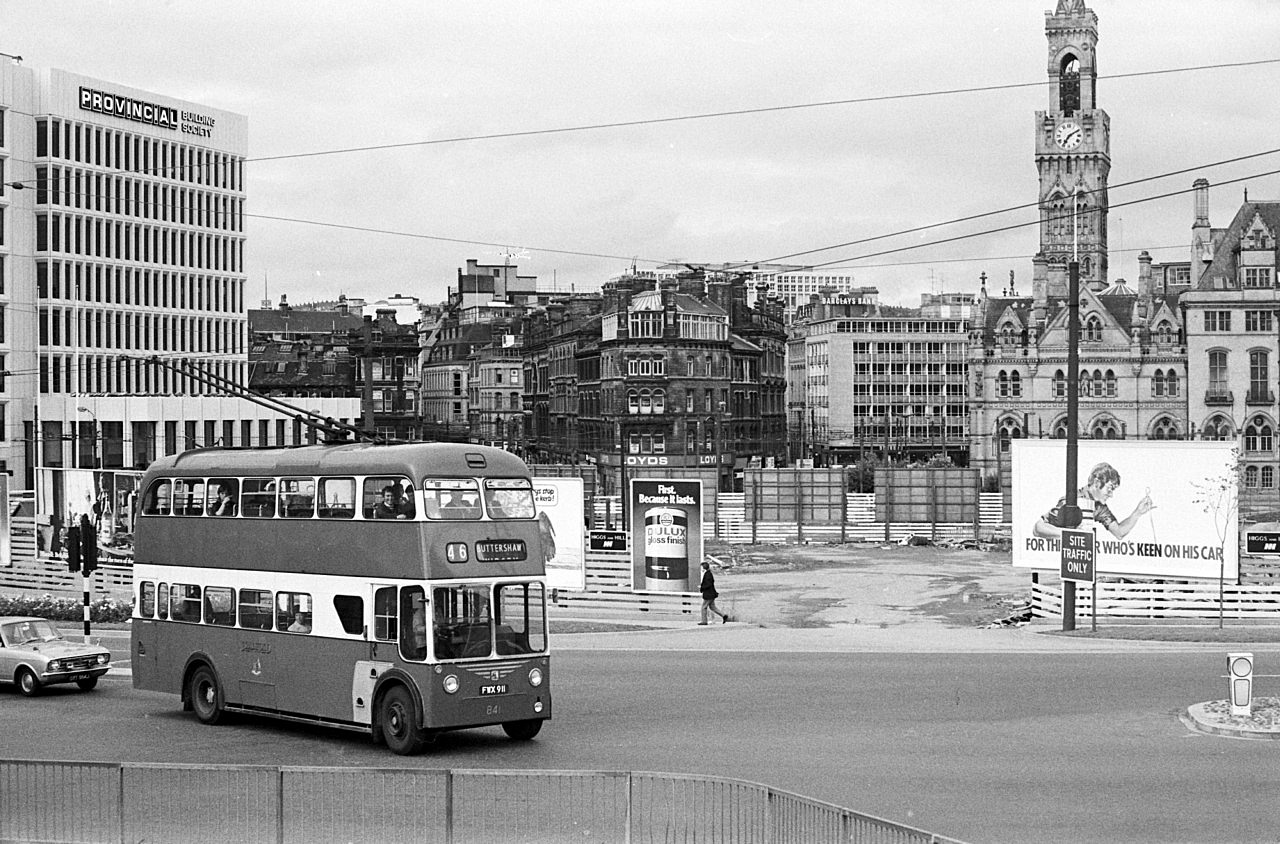
Provincial House (far left) in 1971

National & Provincial had their headquarters at Provincial House, Bradford, which was designed by John Brunton, and were inherited from the Provincial Building Society, who commenced construction in 1969.

Provincial House continued to be occupied by Abbey National after the takeover but the, by then, 55,000 sq ft building was demolished in a controlled explosion on 1 September 2002. The explosion, carried out by Controlled Demolition used 1,500 detonating charges which totalled 90kg worth of explosives.
