= Mechanics Cooperative Bank =

- Type: Mutual organization
- Industry: Banking
- Founded: 1877; 149 years ago
- Headquarters: Taunton, Massachusetts
- Net income: $10.6 million (2025)
- Total assets: $862 million (2025)
- Total equity: $108 million (2025)
- Website: mechanics-coop.com

Mechanics Cooperative Bank is a savings bank headquartered in Taunton, Massachusetts. As of 2026, the bank has 11 offices, 10 of which are in Bristol County, Massachusetts.

== History ==
The bank was founded in 1877 as Mechanics' Co-operative Bank.

In 1986, the bank became insured by the Federal Deposit Insurance Corporation.

In 2007, the bank acquired Bridgewater Cooperative Bank.

In 2008, the bank acquired Lafayette Federal Savings Bank.

In 2011, the bank reorganized into a mutual organization.

In 2014, the bank changed its name to Mechanics Cooperative Bank.
