= Scottish Building Society =

- Type: Building Society (Mutual)
- Industry: Banking; Financial services
- Founded: 1848
- Headquarters: Edinburgh, Scotland, UK
- Number of locations: 6
- Key people: Paul Denton (chief executive)
- Products: Savings and Mortgages
- Total assets: £740.7 million GBP (January 2024)
- Members: 33 600 (January 2024)
- Number of employees: 102
- Website: www.scottishbs.co.uk

Scottish Building Society is a building society based in Edinburgh, Scotland. It is the oldest remaining building society in the world, the only independent building society based in Scotland and the 24th largest in the United Kingdom based on total assets of £740.7 million at 31 January 2024. It is a member of the Building Societies Association.

== History ==
Scottish Building Society was established as the Edinburgh Friendly Property Investment Company in 1848. It changed its name to the Scottish Building Society in 1929.

On 1 February 2013, the Scottish Building Society merged with its Edinburgh competitor Century Building Society. As a result of the merger, it became the only remaining building society to be headquartered in Scotland.
