= Suffolk Building Society =

UK building society in Ipswich

- Formerly: Ipswich Building Society
- Company type: Building Society (Mutual)
- Industry: Banking; Financial services
- Founded: October 1849
- Headquarters: Ipswich, England, UK
- Number of locations: 9
- Products: Savings, mortgages, investments, insurance
- Total assets: £655 million GBP (2022), 7% on 2021
- Number of employees: c. 170
- Website: www.suffolkbuildingsociety.co.uk

The Suffolk Building Society is a UK building society based in Ipswich, Suffolk. It is a member of the Building Societies Association.

The Ipswich & Suffolk Building Society originated in the Ipswich and Suffolk Freehold Land Society, founded in December 1849. The FLS bought up land they divided up into plots that were big enough to qualify for the 40 shilling franchise that gave people the right to vote. It registered as the Ipswich and Suffolk Permanent Benefit Building Society in February 1886 to provide mortgages for people buying land through the FLS.

== History ==
=== Ipswich & Suffolk Building Society ===
The Ipswich & Suffolk Building Society originated as part of the forty-shilling freeholders movement, a project which aimed to make home ownership an option for ordinary people rather than just the landed elite, in October 1849. Initially called the Ipswich & Suffolk Freehold Land Society, its first land acquisition was the Cauldwell Hall Estate, which it divided into 282 plots, selling each to a society member for £23, following a ballot. It then made similar acquisitions and sales in various towns across Suffolk. From 1868 the society started purchasing houses in addition to buying land, its first properties being located on Lancaster Road in Ipswich which it described "high quality, 2-bedroom, workman's houses".

=== Ipswich & District Building Society ===
The Ipswich & District Building Society was established in 1875 as a Starr-Bowkett Society. It held an inauguration meeting held at the Ipswich Lecture Hall, featuring a speech by Richard B. Starr, one of the architects of the Starr-Bowkett model. Starr stated that the society was not intended to be a rival to other building societies in the area, but to offer a new model of financial assistance for working-class people.

=== Merger ===
The Ipswich & Suffolk and the Ipswich & District merged in June 1975, with the new entity trading simply as the Ipswich Building Society. In January 2004, after almost ninety years based in Upper Brook Street, Ipswich, the society moved its headquarters to a new venue at the Ransomes Europark. The old headquarters were retained as a branch, however, until 2009. By November 2011, the society had reached 65,000 members with assets of more than £50,000.

In January 2020, the Ipswich Building Society launched a proposal for a further rename, to the Suffolk Building Society. At the 170th Annual General Meeting (held on 25 March 2020), 92.8% of members who voted were in favour of the name change and so as of 9 November 2021, Ipswich Building Society became known as Suffolk Building Society.

== Branches ==
As of March 2020, the Suffolk Building Society has nine branches in locations across Suffolk. There are two in Ipswich, as well as locations in Hadleigh, Aldeburgh, Halesworth, Haverhill, Saxmundham, Woodbridge, and Sudbury.
