= Building society =

Member-owned financial institution focused on savings and mortgages

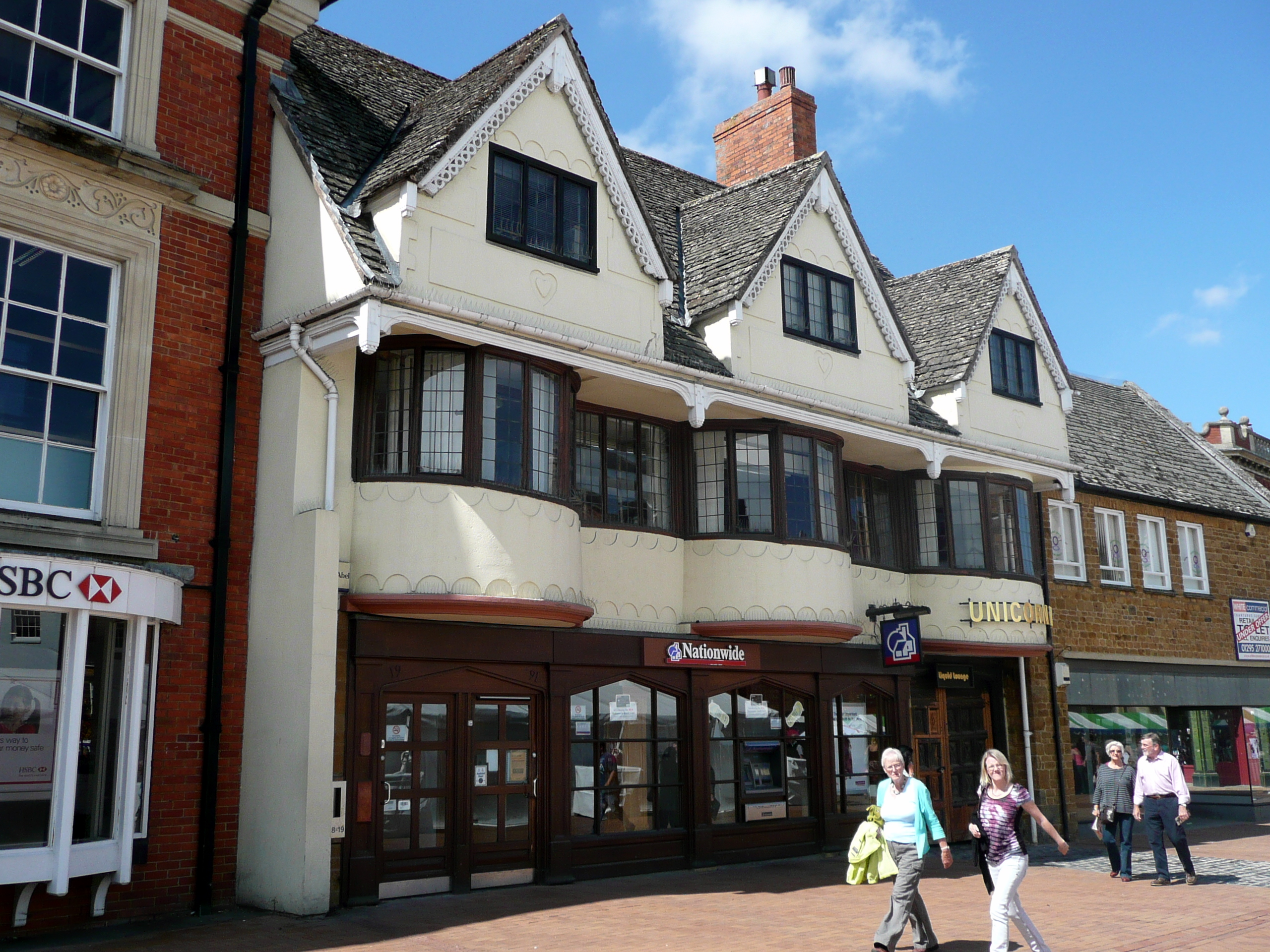
A high street building society branch, in Banbury

A building society is a financial institution owned by its members as a mutual organization, which offers banking and related financial services, especially savings and mortgage lending. They exist in the United Kingdom, Australia and New Zealand, and formerly in Ireland and several Commonwealth countries, including South Africa as mutual banks. They are similar to credit unions, but rather than promoting thrift and offering unsecured and business loans, the purpose of a building society is to provide home mortgages to members. Borrowers and depositors are society members, setting policy and appointing directors on a one-member, one-vote basis. Building societies often provide other retail banking services, such as current accounts, credit cards and personal loans. The term "building society" first arose in the 19th century in Great Britain from cooperative savings groups.

In the United Kingdom, building societies compete with banks for most consumer banking services, especially mortgage lending and savings accounts, and regulations permit up to half of their lending to be funded by debt to non-members, allowing societies to access wholesale bond and money markets to fund mortgages. The world's largest building society is Britain's Nationwide Building Society. In Australia, building societies also compete with retail banks and offer the full range of banking services to consumers.

== History in the United Kingdom ==
Building societies as an institution began in late-18th century Birmingham – a town which was undergoing rapid economic and physical expansion driven by a multiplicity of small metalworking firms, whose many highly skilled and prosperous owners readily invested in property. Many of the early building societies were based in taverns or coffeehouses, which had become the focus for a network of clubs and societies for co-operation and the exchange of ideas among Birmingham's highly active citizenry as part of the movement known as the Midlands Enlightenment. The first building society to be established was Ketley's Building Society, founded by Richard Ketley, the landlord of the Golden Cross inn, in 1775. Members of Ketley's society paid a monthly subscription to a central pool of funds which was used to finance the building of houses for members, which in turn acted as collateral to attract further funding to the society, enabling further construction. By 1781 three more societies had been established in Birmingham, with a fourth in the nearby town of Dudley; and 19 more formed in Birmingham between 1782 and 1795. The first outside the English Midlands was established in Leeds in 1785.

Most of the original societies were fully terminating, where they would be dissolved when all members had a house: the last of them, First Salisbury and District Perfect Thrift Building Society, was wound up in March 1980. In the 1830s and 1840s a new development took place with the permanent building society, where the society continued on a rolling basis, continually taking in new members as earlier ones completed purchases, such as Leek Building Society. The main legislative framework for the building society was the Building Societies Act 1874 (37 & 38 Vict. c. 42), with subsequent amending legislation in 1894, 1939 (see Coney Hall), and 1960.

In their heyday, there were hundreds of building societies: just about every town in the country had a building society named after that town. Over succeeding decades the number of societies has decreased, as various societies merged to form larger ones, often renaming in the process, and other societies opted for demutualisation followed by – in the great majority of cases – eventual takeover by a listed bank. Most of the existing larger building societies are the result of the mergers of many smaller societies.

All building societies in the UK are members of the Building Societies Association. At the start of 2008, there were 59 building societies in the UK, with total assets exceeding £360 billion. The number of societies in the UK fell by four during 2008 due to a series of mergers brought about, to a large extent, by the consequences of the 2008 financial crisis. There were three further mergers in each of 2009 and 2010, a demutualisation and a merger in 2011, and four further mergers 2013–2018 which resulted in there being only one building society headquartered respectively in Scotland and Northern Ireland. Since then, the only merger has been in 2023, when the Manchester society merged with the Newcastle society.

=== Demutualisation ===
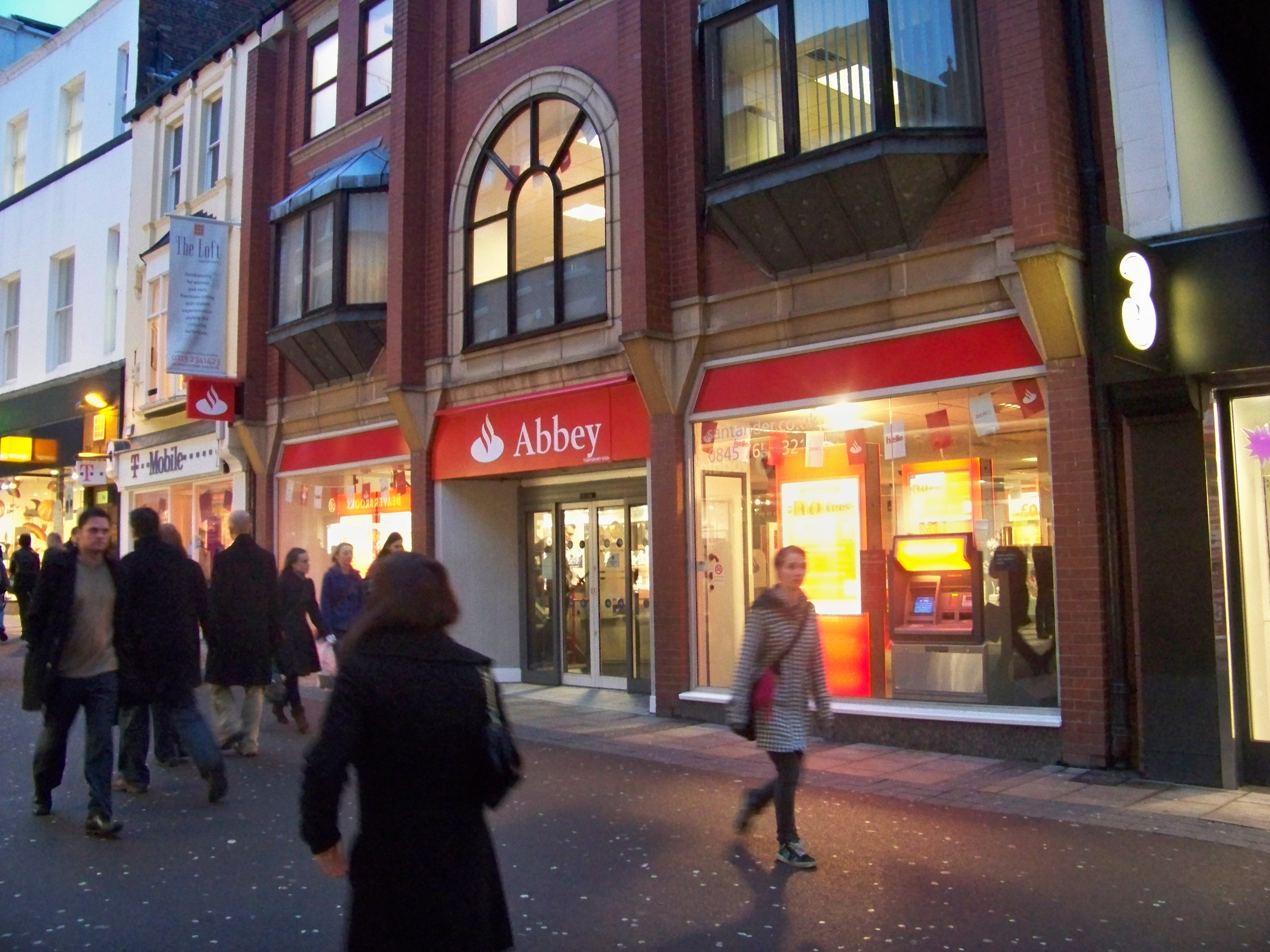
The Abbey National was the first society to demutualise in July 1989.

In the 1980s, changes to British banking laws allowed building societies to offer banking services equivalent to normal banks. The management of a number of societies still felt that they were unable to compete with the banks, and a new Building Societies Act was passed in 1986 in response to their concerns. This permitted societies to 'demutualise'. If more than 75% of members voted in favour, the building society would then become a limited company like any other. Members' mutual rights were exchanged for shares in this new company. A number of the larger societies made such proposals to their members and all were accepted. Some listed on the London Stock Exchange, while others were acquired by larger financial groups.

The process began with the demutualisation of the Abbey National Building Society in 1989. Then, from 1995 to late 1999, eight societies demutualised accounting for two-thirds of building societies assets as at 1994. Five of these societies became joint stock banks (plc), one merged with another and the other four were taken over by plcs (in two cases after the mutual had previously converted to a plc).

As Tayler (2003) mentions, demutualisation moves succeeded immediately because neither Conservative nor Labour party UK governments created a framework which put obstacles in the way of demutualisation. Political acquiescence in demutualisation was clearest in the case of the position on 'carpetbaggers', that is those who joined societies by lodging minimum amounts of £100 or so in the hope of profiting from a distribution of surplus after demutualisation. The deregulating Building Societies Act 1986 contained an anti-carpetbagger provision in the form of a two-year rule. This prescribed a qualifying period of two years before savers could participate in a residual claim. But, before the 1989 Abbey National Building Society demutualisation, the courts found against the two-year rule after legal action brought by Abbey National itself to circumvent the intent of the legislators. After this the legislation did prevent a cash distribution to members of less than two years standing, but the same result was obtained by permitting the issue of 'free' shares in the acquiring plc, saleable for cash. The Thatcher Conservative government declined to introduce amending legislation to make good the defect in the 'two-year rule'.

=== 1980s and 1990s ===
Building societies, like mutual life insurers, arose as people clubbed together to address a common need interest; in the case of the building societies, this was housing and members were originally both savers and borrowers. But it very quickly became clear that 'outsider' savers were needed whose motive was profit through interest on deposits. Thus permanent building societies quickly became mortgage banks and in such institutions there always existed a conflict of interest between borrowers and savers. It was the task of the movement to reconcile that conflict of interest so as to enable savers to conclude that their interests and those of borrowers were to some extent complementary rather than conflictive. Conflict of interest between savers and borrowers was never fully reconciled in the building societies but upon deregulation that reconciliation became something of a lost cause. The management of building societies apparently could expend considerable time and resources (which belonged the organisation) planning their effective capture—of as much of the assets as they could. If so, this is arguably insider dealing on a grand scale with the benefit of inside specialist knowledge of the business and resources of the firm not shared with outsiders like politicians and members (and, perhaps, regulators). Once the opportunity to claim was presented by management the savers in particular could be relied upon to seize it. There were sufficient hard-up borrowers to take the inducement offered them by management (in spite of few simple sums sufficing to demonstrate that they were probably going to end up effectively paying back the inducement). (Tayler 2003)

Management promoting demutualisation also thereby met managerial objectives because the end of mutuality brought joint stock company (plc) style remuneration committee pay standards and share options. Share options for management of converting societies appear to be a powerful factor in management calculation. Rasmusen (1988) refers to this in the following terms:

" ... perks do not rise in proportion to [mutual] bank size. If a mutual is large, or is expected to grow if it can raise capital by a conversion, its managers derive more value from a conversion but do not suffer much loss of perks than if the bank were small. Their benefit is in the right to purchase the new stock, which are valuable because the new issues are consistently underpriced [referring to USA mutual bank conversions]. Moreover, by no means are all mutual managers incompetent, and conversions allows the bank to expand more easily and to grant executive stock options that are valuable to skilled managers".

Instead of deploying their margin advantage as a defence of mutuality, around 1980 building societies began setting mortgage rates with reference to market clearing levels. In sum they began behaving more like banks, seeking to maximise profit instead of the advantages of a mutual organisation. Thus, according to the Bank of England's Boxall & Gallagher (1997):

"... there was virtually no difference between banks and building society 'listed' interest rates for home finance mortgage lending between 1984 and 1997. This behaviour resulted in a return on assets for building societies which was at least as high as Plc banks and, in the absence of distribution, led to rapid accumulation of reserves".

As Boxall & Gallagher (1997) also observe:

"... accumulation of reserves in the early-1990s, beyond regulatory and future growth requirements, is difficult to reconcile with conventional theories of mutual behaviour".

Llewellyn (1996) draws a rather more direct and cynical conclusion:

By adopting a policy of building up reserves by maintaining an excess margin, building societies simultaneously allowed banks to compete and may have undermined the long run viability of mutuality. A more cynical approach is that some societies may have adopted an excess-margin strategy simply to enhance their value for conversion.

Some of these managements ended up in dispute with their own members. Of the first major conversion of the Abbey in 1989, Kay (1991) observed:

[T]he paradox of the Abbey members who campaigned against flotation [conversion to a shareholder-owned bank] of their building society. They were fighting to preserve a degree of accountability to the membership which the management of the Society patently did not feel. For incumbent management, the contrary views of some of their members were not matters to be weighed in the balance and taken account of in formulation of policy. They were a nuisance to be dealt with by the costly use of public relations advisers and legal processes.

In the end, after a number of large demutualisations, and pressure from carpetbaggers moving from one building society to another to cream off the windfalls, most of the societies whose management wished to keep them mutual modified their rules of membership in the late 1990s. The method usually adopted were membership rules to ensure that anyone newly joining a society would, for the first few years, be unable to get any profit out of a demutualisation. With the chance of a quick profit removed, the wave of demutualisations came to an end in 2000.

One academic study (Heffernan 2003) found that demutualised societies' pricing behaviour on deposits and mortgages was more favourable to shareholders than to customers, with the remaining mutual building societies offering consistently better rates.

=== 2000s and 2010s ===
The Building Societies (Funding) and Mutual Societies (Transfers) Act 2007, known as the Butterfill Act, was passed in 2007 giving building societies greater powers to merge with other companies. These powers have been used by the Britannia in 2009 and Kent Reliance in 2011 leading to their demutualisation.

Prior to 31 December 2010, deposits with building societies of up to £50,000 per individual, per institution, were normally protected by the Financial Services Compensation Scheme (FSCS), but Nationwide and Yorkshire building societies negotiated a temporary change to the terms of the FSCS to protect members of the societies they acquired in late 2008/early 2009. The amended terms allowed former members of multiple societies which merge into one to maintain multiple entitlements to FSCS protection until 30 September 2009 (later extended to 30 December 2010), so (for example) a member with £50,000 in each of Nationwide, Cheshire and Derbyshire at the time of the respective mergers would retain £150,000 of FSCS protection for their funds in the merged Nationwide. On 31 December 2010 the general FSCS limit for retail deposits was increased to £85,000 for banks and building societies and the transitional arrangements in respect of building society mergers came to an end.

== List of building societies ==
=== United Kingdom ===
==== Current ====
As of July 2026, there are 42 independent building societies, all of which are members of the Building Societies Association.

	Name	Group assets (millions)	Other trading names	Numbers of		No. of staff	Provides current account?
	Name	Group assets (millions)	Other trading names	Branches	Agencies	No. of staff	Provides current account?
1	Nationwide Building Society	£382,328	The Mortgage Works; Subsidiary: Virgin Money (inc. Clydesdale Bank)	605 + 91 (Virgin Money)		17,978 (Note: Not including Virgin Money)	
2	Coventry Building Society	£88,239	Subsidiary: The Co-operative Bank	56 + 47 (Co-operative Bank)		2,824 (Note: Not including The Co-operative Bank)	(Note: Operates current accounts through The Co-operative Bank subsidiary.)
3	Yorkshire Building Society	£66,330	Chelsea Building Society; Accord	132	99	3,117	
4	Skipton Building Society	£40,744		82		2,506	
5	Leeds Building Society	£31,962		50		1,538	
6	Principality Building Society	£13,944		54	14	1,157	
7	Newcastle Building Society	£7,012	Manchester Building Society	31		1,393	
8	West Bromwich Building Society	£6,653		37		633	
9	Nottingham Building Society	£5,436		31		513	
10	Cumberland Building Society	£3,463		34		634	(Note: If customer resides within their "operating area".)
11	National Counties Building Society	£2,936	Family Building Society	1		196	
12	Progressive Building Society (Note: These societies do not form part of a corporate business group, although they may own other businesses.)	£2,280		11	36	172	
13	Cambridge Building Society	£2,121		13		236	
14	Newbury Building Society	£1,747		10		180	
15	Monmouthshire Building Society	£1,719		11	11	145	
16	Saffron Building Society	£1,545		8		181	
17	Furness Building Society	£1,483		9		177	
18	Leek United Building Society	£1,452		12		164	
19	Darlington Building Society	£1,024		9		113	
20	Suffolk Building Society	£960		9	1	123	
21	Scottish Building Society	£883		6	61	71	
22	Hinckley and Rugby Building Society	£881		7	2	116	
23	Marsden Building Society	£864		8		79	
24	Market Harborough Building Society	£808		5		118	
25	Melton Building Society	£759		5		88	
26	Swansea Building Society	£715		4		36	
27	Tipton & Coseley Building Society	£668		4		83	
28	Dudley Building Society	£680		5		91	
29	Loughborough Building Society	£606		5	1	55	
30	Mansfield Building Society	£585		4		73	
31	Vernon Building Society	£534		6		68	
32	Hanley Economic Building Society	£489		7		73	
33	Harpenden Building Society	£463		4		64	
34	Bath Building Society	£436		2		67	
35	Chorley & District Building Society	£413		3		50	
36	Teachers Building Society	£366		1		39	
37	Buckinghamshire Building Society	£348		1		39	
38	Ecology Building Society	£348		1		25	
39	Stafford Railway Building Society	£347		1		31	
40	Beverley Building Society	£226		1		22	
41	Earl Shilton Building Society	£188		2		27	
42	Penrith Building Society	£171		1		26	

==== Demutualised ====
Ten building societies of the United Kingdom demutualised between 1989 and 2000, either becoming a bank or being acquired by a larger bank. By 2008, every building society that floated on the stock market in the wave of demutualisations of the 1980s and 1990s had either been sold to a conventional bank, or been nationalised.

Name	Fate	Successor	Year	Current position
Abbey National	converted to plc	Santander	1989	The new bank, also known as "Abbey", was acquired by Banco Santander and now rebranded as Santander.
Cheltenham and Gloucester	taken over by	Lloyds Bank	1994	Became part of Lloyds TSB, although C&G still had a branch network which became part of TSB Bank in summer 2013.
National & Provincial	taken over by	Abbey National	1995	Business merged into Abbey National (now Santander), name no longer used.
Alliance & Leicester	converted to plc	Santander	1997	Acquired by Banco Santander, which also owns Abbey, in October 2008, and merged into Santander in 2010.
Bristol and West	taken over by	Bank of Ireland	1997	Became a division of Bank of Ireland but its savings balances and branch network transferred to Britannia Building Society in 2005 (which in turn merged with Co-operative Financial Services). Bristol & West mortgages ceased trading in January 2009.
Halifax	converted to plc		1997	Became part of HBOS in 2001, which became part of Lloyds Banking Group in 2009. Trading name in use until October 2026.
Northern Rock	converted to plc	Virgin Money; Northern Rock (Asset Management)	1997	Nationalised following near bankruptcy in February 2008, due to the 2008 financial crisis. Most of the business bought by Virgin Money UK in January 2012, with remaining riskier mortgage business retained by the government and renamed NRAM plc (now Landmark Mortgages Limited).
The Woolwich	converted to plc	Barclays	1997	Now part of Barclays plc. Woolwich brand name now only used for mortgages from Barclays with the Woolwich branch network merging with that of Barclays in 2007.
Birmingham Midshires	taken over by	Halifax	1999	Now owned by Lloyds Banking Group. The brand name is still retained, but running entirely by post and internet.
Bradford & Bingley	converted to plc		2000	Nationalisation with sale of savings book to Abbey (now Santander).

==== No longer exist ====
The following is an incomplete list of building societies in the United Kingdom that no longer exist independently, since they either merged with or were taken over by other organisations. They may still have an active presence on the high street (or online) as a trading name or as a distinct brand. This is typically because brands will often build up specific reputations and attract certain clientele, and this can continue to be marketed successfully.

Name	Fate	Successor	Year
Abbey Road Building Society and National Building Society	merged to form the	Abbey National Building Society	1944
Bingley Permanent Building Society and Bradford Equitable Building Society	merged to form the	Bradford & Bingley Building Society	1964
Co-operative Permanent Building Society	changed its name to	Nationwide Building Society	1970
Leicester Permanent Building Society and Leicester Temperance Building Society	merged to form the	Leicester Building Society	1974
Bedfordshire Building Society and Temperance Building Society (Note: The Temperance Permanent was so-called because the directors were required to sign the pledge, a requirement which was dropped with the merger and name-change – to the reported dismay of some members. [The Times, Friday, 25 April 1975; pg. 4; Issue 59379; col E, 'Temperance abandoned by building society'. Retrieved from InfoTrac on 17 July 2008].)	merged to form	Gateway Building Society	1974
Leek & Westbourne Building Society and Oldbury Britannia Building Society	merged to form	Britannia Building Society	1975
Huddersfield & Bradford Building Society and West Yorkshire Building Society	merged to form	Yorkshire Building Society	1982
Coventry Economic Building Society and Coventry Provident Building Society	merged to form the	Coventry Building Society	1983
Burnley Building Society and Provincial Building Society	merged to form the	National & Provincial Building Society	1984
London Permanent Building Society (est 1914)	merged into	Cheltenham and Gloucester	1984
Alliance Building Society and Leicester Building Society	merged to form the	Alliance & Leicester Building Society	1985
Waltham Abbey Building Society (1847)	merged with the	Cheltenham and Gloucester Building Society	1985
Birmingham & Bridgwater Building Society and Midshires Building Society	merged to form the	Birmingham Midshires Building Society	1986
Norwich Building Society and Peterborough Building Society	merged to form the	Norwich & Peterborough Building Society	1986
Anglia Building Society and Nationwide Building Society	merged to form which changed name to the	Nationwide Anglia Building Society; Nationwide Building Society	1987; 1991
Gateway Building Society and Woolwich Equitable Building Society	merged to form the	Woolwich Building Society	1988
Wessex Building Society and Portman Building Society	merged to form the	Portman Wessex Building Society	1989
Regency & West of England Building Society and Portman Wessex Building Society	merged to form	Portman Building Society	1990
Hendon Building Society	was taken over by	Bradford & Bingley Building Society	1991
Haywards Heath Building Society	merged with the	Yorkshire Building Society	1992
Cheshunt Building Society	merged with the	Bristol and West Building Society	1992
Heart of England Building Society	merged with the	Cheltenham & Gloucester Building Society	1993
St. Pancras Building Society	merged with the	Portman Building Society	1993
Leeds Permanent Building Society	merged with the	Halifax Building Society	1995
City & Metropolitan Building Society	merged with the	Stroud & Swindon Building Society	1996
Nottingham Imperial Building Society	merged with the	Newcastle Building Society	2000
Gainsborough Building Society	merged with the	Yorkshire Building Society	2001
Ilkeston Permanent Building Society	merged with the	Derbyshire Building Society	2001
Clay Cross Building Society	merged with the	Derbyshire Building Society	2003
Padiham Building Society	merged with the	Bradford & Bingley Building Society	1983
Staffordshire Building Society	merged with the	Portman Building Society	2003
Lambeth Building Society	merged with the	Portman Building Society	2006
Mercantile Building Society	merged with the	Leeds Building Society	2006
Universal Building Society	merged with the	Newcastle Building Society	2006
Portman Building Society	merged with the	Nationwide Building Society	2007
Cheshire Building Society	merged with the	Nationwide Building Society	2008
Derbyshire Building Society	merged with the	Nationwide Building Society	2008
Barnsley Building Society	merged with the	Yorkshire Building Society	2008
Catholic Building Society	merged with the	Chelsea Building Society	2008
Scarborough Building Society (Note: Merger of Skipton Building Society and Scarborough Building Society, 29 November 2008. Archived 10 April 2009 at the Wayback Machine)	merged with the	Skipton Building Society	2009
Dunfermline Building Society	most assets and liabilities transferred to	Nationwide Building Society	2009
Britannia Building Society (Note: Britannia and Co-operative Financial Services unveil plans for super-mutual (Retrieved 22 January 2009) Archived 27 June 2009 at the Wayback Machine)	acquired by	The Co-operative Bank	2009
Chelsea Building Society	merged with the	Yorkshire Building Society	2010
Chesham Building Society (Note: Chesham Building Society AGM, 31 March 2010. Archived 30 May 2010 at the Wayback Machine, accessed 1 April 2010)	merged with the	Skipton Building Society	2010
Stroud & Swindon Building Society	merged with the	Coventry Building Society	2010
Kent Reliance Building Society	acquired by	OneSavings Plc to form OneSavings Bank	2011
Norwich and Peterborough Building Society	merged with the	Yorkshire Building Society	2011
Century Building Society	merged with the	Scottish Building Society	2013
Shepshed Building Society	merged with the	Nottingham Building Society	2013
City of Derry Building Society	merged with the	Progressive Building Society	2014
Holmesdale Building Society	merged with the	Skipton Building Society	2018
Manchester Building Society	merged with the	Newcastle Building Society	2023

=== Australia ===
In Australia, building societies evolved along British lines. Following the end of World War II, the terminating model was revived to fund returning servicemen's need for new houses. Hundreds were created with government seed capital, whereby the capital was returned to the government and the terminating societies retained the interest accumulated. Once all the seed funds were loaned, each terminating society could reapply for more seed capital to the point where they could re-lend their own funds and thus became a permanent society.

Terminating loans were still available and used inside the permanent businesses by staff up until the 1980s because their existence was not widely known after the early 1960s. Because of strict regulations on banks, building societies flourished until the deregulation of the Australian financial industry in the 1980s. Eventually many of the smaller building societies disappeared, while some of the largest (such as Advance and St George) attained the status of banks.

More recent conversions have included Heritage Bank which converted from building society to bank in 2011, Hume in 2014, while Wide Bay Building Society became Auswide Bank and IMB followed suit in 2015, and Greater Building Society became Greater Bank in 2016. Building societies converting to banks are no longer required to demutualise.

A particular difference between Australian building societies and those elsewhere, is that Australian building societies are required to incorporate as limited companies.

Current building societies are

- Bass & Equitable Building Society (Tasmania)
- Maitland Mutual Building Society (Maitland)

=== Eswatini ===
The Building Societies Act of 1962 allowed for the registration of building societies in Eswatini. For a long time the country only had one building society. A second was registered in late 2019.

- Swaziland Building Society: Registered in the 1960s, this is the first and oldest building society in Eswatini. It has branches in almost every town and city within the Kingdom and has been known to be conservative. There have been many rumours of this institution wishing to demutualise to the extent that an amendment to the Building Societies Act was passed in 2019 permitting building societies to demutualise and apply for banking licences.
- Status Capital Building Society: Status Capital Building Society was registered as the country's second building society and granted a licence in 2019 by the Financial Services Regulatory Authority after approval and recommendation from the Minister of Finance.

=== Ireland ===
The Republic of Ireland had around 40 building societies at the mid-20th century peak. Many of these were very small and, as the Irish commercial banks began to originate residential mortgages, the small building societies ceased to be competitive. Most merged or dissolved or, in the case of First Active plc, converted into conventional banks. The last remaining building societies, EBS Building Society and Irish Nationwide Building Society, demutualised and were transferred or acquired into Bank subsidiaries in 2011 following the effects of the Irish financial crisis.

Leeds Building Society Ireland and Nationwide UK (Ireland) were Irish branches of building societies based in the United Kingdom; both have since ceased all Irish operations.

Name	Demutualised	Successor
Irish Industrial Benefit Building Society (1873–1969) Irish Industrial Building Society (1969–1975); Irish Nationwide Building Society (1975 – Feb 2011) acquired Irish Mutual Building Society, 1989 formerly Allied Irish Building Society(−1976) acquired Garda Building Society, 1983 acquired Metropolitan Building Society, 1991	February 2011	deposit book Permanent TSB Group Holdings plc (February 2011–June 2011) loan book Anglo Irish Bank (February 2011–June 2011); Irish Bank Resolution Corporation (July 2011–February 2013)
Educational Building Society (1935−1991) acquired The Family Building Society, 1975 EBS Building Society (1991–2011) acquired Midland and Western Building Society, 1994 acquired Norwich Irish Building Society, 1998	July 2011	EBS d.a.c., subsidiary of Allied Irish Banks
Irish Temperance Permanent Building Society (−1888) Irish Permanent Benefit Building Society (1888–1940); Irish Permanent Building Society (1940–1994) acquired Provident Building Society, 1974 acquired Cork Mutual Building Society, 1975 acquired Munster & Leinster Building Society, 1978 acquired Guinness & Mahon, 1994	1994	Irish Permanent plc (1994–1999) Permanent TSB Group Holdings plc (1999–) merged with TSB Bank, 2001; Permanent TSB Group Holdings plc
Irish Civil Services and General Building Society (1864–1867) Irish Civil Service and General (Permanent Benefit) Building Society (1867–1874); Irish Civil Service (Permanent) Building Society (1874–1969) acquired City and County Permanent Benefit Building Society, 1932 Irish Civil Service Building Society (1969–1984) acquired O'Connell Benefit Building Society, 1983	1984	subsidiary of Bank of Ireland renamed ICS Building Society (1986)
Workingman's Benefit Building Society (−1960) First National Building Society (1960–1998) acquired Grafton Savings and Building Society, 1974 acquired The Guinness Permanent Building Society, 1984 acquired Ireland Benefit Building Society, 1984 acquired Postal Service Permanent Building Society, 1985 acquired Irish Life Building Society, 1993	1998	First Active plc (1998–2004) acquired by Ulster Bank 2004 and retired in 2009

==== Society closures ====
- Ballygall Building Society, 1977
- City and Provincial Building Society, 1978
- Dublin Model Building Society, 1984
- Dublin Savings Building Society, 1977
- Four Provinces Building Society, 1978
- Independent Building Society, 1977
- Irish Savings Building Society, 1984
- National Provincial Building Society, 1977
- Progressive Building Society, 1977
- West of Ireland Building Society, 1977

=== Jamaica ===
In Jamaica, three building societies compete with commercial banks and credit unions for most consumer financial services:

- Jamaica National Building Society
- Victoria Mutual Building Society
- Scotia Jamaica Building Society

=== New Zealand ===
==== Regulation ====
In New Zealand, building societies are registered with the Registrar of Building Societies under the Building Societies Act 1965. Registration as a building society is merely a process of establishing the entity as a corporation. It is largely a formality, and easily achieved, as the capital requirement is minimal (20 members must be issued shares of not less than NZ$1,000 each, with a total minimum foundation share capital of NZ$200,000).

As regards prudential supervision, a divide exists between building societies that operate in New Zealand, on the one hand, and those that (although formally registered in New Zealand) operate offshore:

- Building societies that accept deposits from members of the public in New Zealand are regulated as "non-bank deposit takers" under the Non-bank Deposit Takers Act 2013. Such building societies must (unless they qualify for a particular exemption) comply with the prudential regulations. The Reserve Bank of New Zealand monitors compliance with the prudential regulations, but does not prudentially supervise individual building societies for financial soundness. Most such building societies are supervised for compliance with the terms of their debt securities by trustees appointed under securities legislation, and those trustees have various reporting requirements to the Reserve Bank.
- Building societies that accept deposits only from offshore customers are not regulated under the Non-bank Deposit Takers Act 2013 or New Zealand's financial markets legislation. Consequently, they are not prudentially monitored by the Reserve Bank or by the Financial Markets Authority. The Reserve Bank cautions on its website that it does not monitor transactions undertaken by New Zealand registered building societies operating in overseas markets. The Department of Internal Affairs is ultimately responsible for all entities that do not expressly fall into other categories for anti money laundering purposes.

Building societies' registration details and filed documents are available in the Register of Building Societies held at the New Zealand Companies Office.

==== Individual building societies ====
Over the years, a number of building societies were established.

Some, including Countrywide Building Society and United Building Society, became banks in the 1980s and 1990s. Heartland Building Society (created in 2011 through a merger of Canterbury Building Society, Southern Cross Building Society, and two other financial institutions) became Heartland Bank on 17 December 2012.

Remaining building societies include:

- Pacific Eagle Capital (formerly General Equity Building Society)
- Heretaunga Building Society
- Kiwi Deposit Building Society (in the process of dissolution since 2013)
- Manawatu Permanent Building Society
- Nelson Building Society
- Southland Building Society, which in October 2008 became a registered bank known as SBS Bank. However, it remains a building society and retains its mutual structure.
- Hastings Building Society merged with SBS Bank in October 2010, but with the Hastings Building Society brand continuing to operate as a building society under the name of HBS Bank. In November 2015, HBS Bank brand was discontinued.
- Wairarapa Building Society.

=== Zimbabwe ===
In Zimbabwe, Central Africa Building Society (CABS) is the leading building society offering a diverse range of financial products and services that include transaction and savings accounts, mobile banking, mortgage loans, money market investments, term deposits and pay-roll loans.

== Similar organisations in other countries ==
In other countries there are mutual organisations similar to building societies:

- Austria: In Austria there are four co-operative banks: Allgemeine Bausparkasse (ABV), Raiffeisen-Bausparkasse, Bausparkasse Wüstenrot AG and Bausparkasse der Sparkassen (savings bank).
- Finland: In Finland the Mortgage Society of Finland, a permanent building society, was founded in 1860. Since 2002 mortgage loans are handled by Suomen AsuntoHypoPankki, the licensed bank owned by the society.
- Germany: In Germany there are 8 Bausparkassen of the Sparkassen-Finanzgruppe named Landesbausparkassen (LBS) and 12 private Bausparkassen, for example Schwäbisch Hall, Wüstenrot, Deutsche Bank Bauspar AG and so on.
- United States: In the United States, savings and loan associations, as well as credit unions, have a similar organisation and purpose.
- Denmark In Denmark, nearly all home mortgages are done through a Realkreditinstitut who issue low interest rate bonds tied directly to the value of the home. These institutions are historically member-owned, but since the 00's, several has been acquired by commercial banks. These bonds can cover up to 80% of the home's value, and additional loans at higher rates are needed if you need to finance the rest.
- Other: See Cooperative banking.

== Operational differences from banks ==
=== Roll numbers ===
Because most building societies were not direct members of the UK clearing system, it was common for them to use a roll number to identify accounts rather than to allocate a six-digit sort-code and eight-digit account number to the BACS standards.

More recently, building societies have tended to obtain sort-code and account number allocations within the clearing system, and hence the use of roll numbers has diminished. When using BACS, one needs to enter roll numbers for the reference field and the building society's generic sort code and account number would be entered in the standard BACS fields.

== See also ==
- Banking in the United Kingdom
- Mutual organisation
- Mutualism
