= Century Building Society =

- Company type: Building Society (Mutual)
- Industry: Financial services
- Founded: 1899
- Fate: Merged with Scottish Building Society, 2013
- Headquarters: Albany Street, Edinburgh, Scotland, UK
- Products: Savings and Mortgages
- Net income: £94,000 GBP (December 2007), 0.0% on 2006
- Total assets: £22.4 million GBP (December 2007), 11.3% on 2006
- Website: century-building-society.co.uk

The Century Building Society was a building society based in Albany Street, Edinburgh, Scotland.

== History ==
The society was established as The New Edinburgh Investment Building Society in 1899. The name was changed to Century Building Society in 1946.

In the early 21st century, the Century Building Society was the smallest building society in Scotland and the United Kingdom, based on total assets of £22 million at 31 December 2007.

The Century Building Society merged with its local rival Scottish Building Society on 1 February 2013.
