= Buckinghamshire Building Society =

British building society

- Formerly: Chalfont & District Permanent Building Society
- Company type: Building Society (Mutual)
- Industry: Banking; Financial services
- Founded: 1907
- Headquarters: Chalfont St Giles, England
- Number of locations: 1
- Area served: United Kingdom
- Key people: Dick Jenkins, Chair of the Board; Dan Wass, Chief Executive Officer
- Products: Savings and Mortgages
- Total assets: ▲£355 million GBP (31 December 2022)
- Members: 11,400
- Website: www.bucksbs.co.uk

The Buckinghamshire Building Society is a British building society. As of 2022, the Society has 11,400 Members and assets of £355m.

It was founded in Chalfont St Giles, Buckinghamshire, by a group of local businessmen, as the Chalfont & District Permanent Building Society in 1907.

It is a member of the Building Societies Association.
