= BIBS =

BIBS may refer to:

- A Built-In Breathing System, a source of breathable gas for emergencies
- The Bath Investment and Building Society, a British financial institution
- The Beanstalk International Bilingual School system, based in Beijing, China
