= The Cambridge Building Society =

Financial institution in the United Kingdom

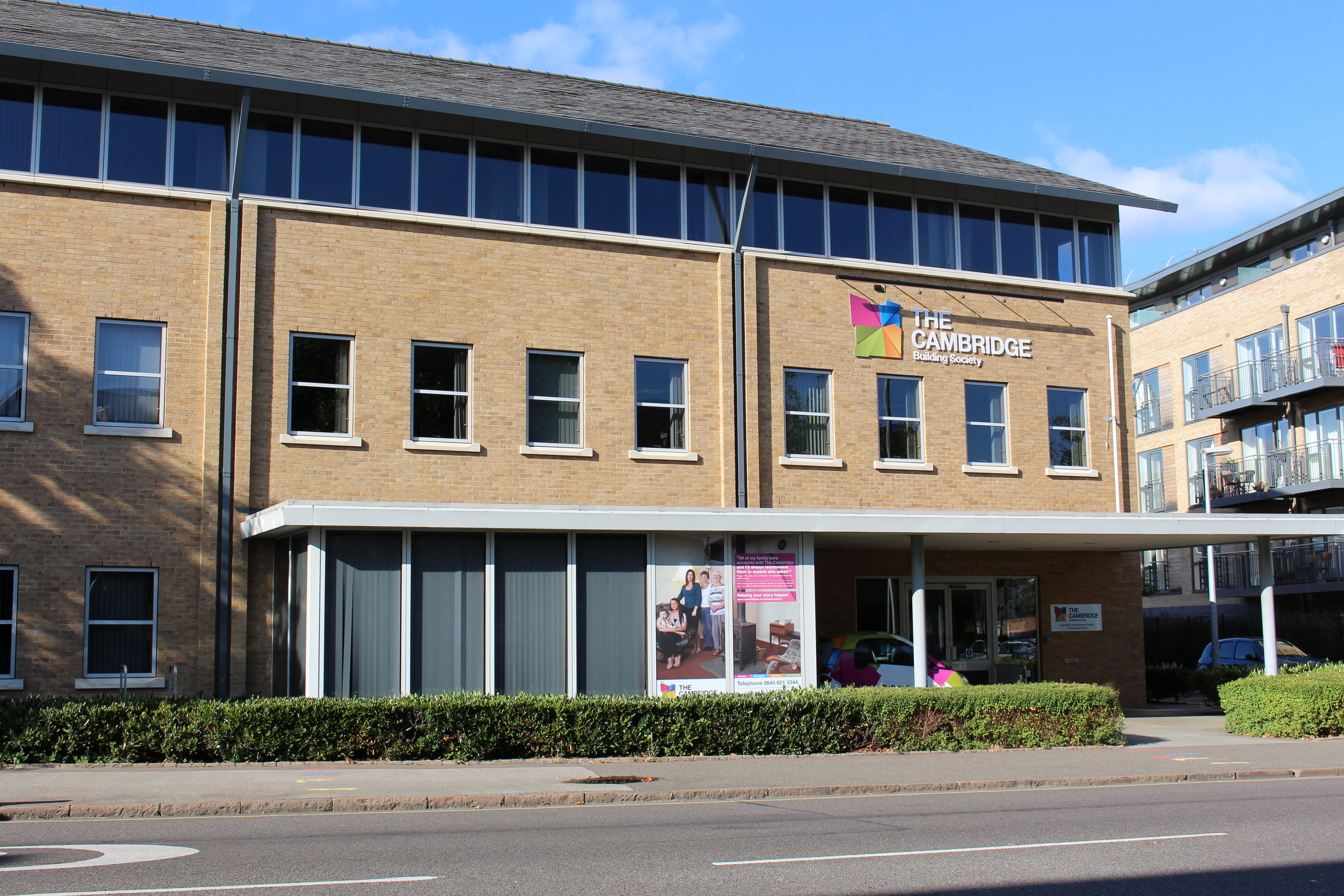
- The Cambridge Building Society head office
- Formerly: Cambridgeshire Permanent Benefit Building Society
- Type: Building Society (mutual)
- Industry: Banking; Financial services
- Founded: 1850; 176 years ago
- Headquarters: Cambridge, England
- Number of locations: 13
- Key people: John Spence (chair); Peter Burrows (chief executive)
- Products: Savings, Mortgages and Insurance
- Revenue: ▲£37.6 million (2022)
- Operating income: ▲£17.0 million (2022)
- Net income: ▲£13.7 million (2022)
- Total assets: ▲£1,859.5 million (2022)
- Total equity: ▲£113.9 million (2022)
- Number of employees: 236 (2022); 225 (2021)
- Website: cambridgebs.co.uk

The Cambridge Building Society is a UK mutual building society based in Cambridge, Cambridgeshire, England. It is the 13th largest in the United Kingdom based on total assets of more than £1.8 billion at December 2022. It is a member of the Building Societies Association. It was formed in 1850 as the Cambridgeshire Permanent Benefit Building Society, adopting its current name in 1945.

There is no connection between the Cambridge Building Society and the Cambridge Foresters’ Benefit Building Society which was dissolved in 1960 or the Cambridge Peers Economic Building Society which was dissolved in 1972.

== History ==
The society was established in 1850. 2016 saw a number of changes to its branch network, with closure of the branches in Burwell, Chesterton, Mill Road, Milton and Soham reducing the branch network to 13.

In 2017, the society announced a £15m investment partnership with The Cambridgeshire County Council Pension Fund through the issuance of Core Capital Deferred Shares – the second building society to do so after Nationwide. In 2017, it also launched an app for savings and mortgage customers. In March 2020, the society expanded its lending area, across all of England and Wales.

== Products and services ==
The Cambridge Building Society offers a range of fixed and variable rate mortgages. Other products and services available through The Cambridge Building Society include savings, (business and council savings), home insurance and travel money.

== Financial performance ==
In 2019 The Cambridge Building Society reported gross lending of £295m and mortgage book growth of 8%. Assets as at 31 December totalled £1.586 billion and profit after tax reached £3.6 million. General reserves were stable at £87.3 million.

== Branch changes ==
Following the society's announcement of a three-year investment programme in 2016, in June of that year it closed five branches (in the villages of Burwell, Soham and Milton and on Mill Road and Chesterton Road in Cambridge) of the 18 branches then operational. Five members of staff were deployed elsewhere within the society. The society also introduced digital technology into two branches. The society opened a new branch in Central Cambridge in 2018. It refurbished its branches in Great Shelford and Ely in 2019, and opened a new branch in Bury St Edmunds in 2022.
