= Cheshunt Building Society =

UK building society

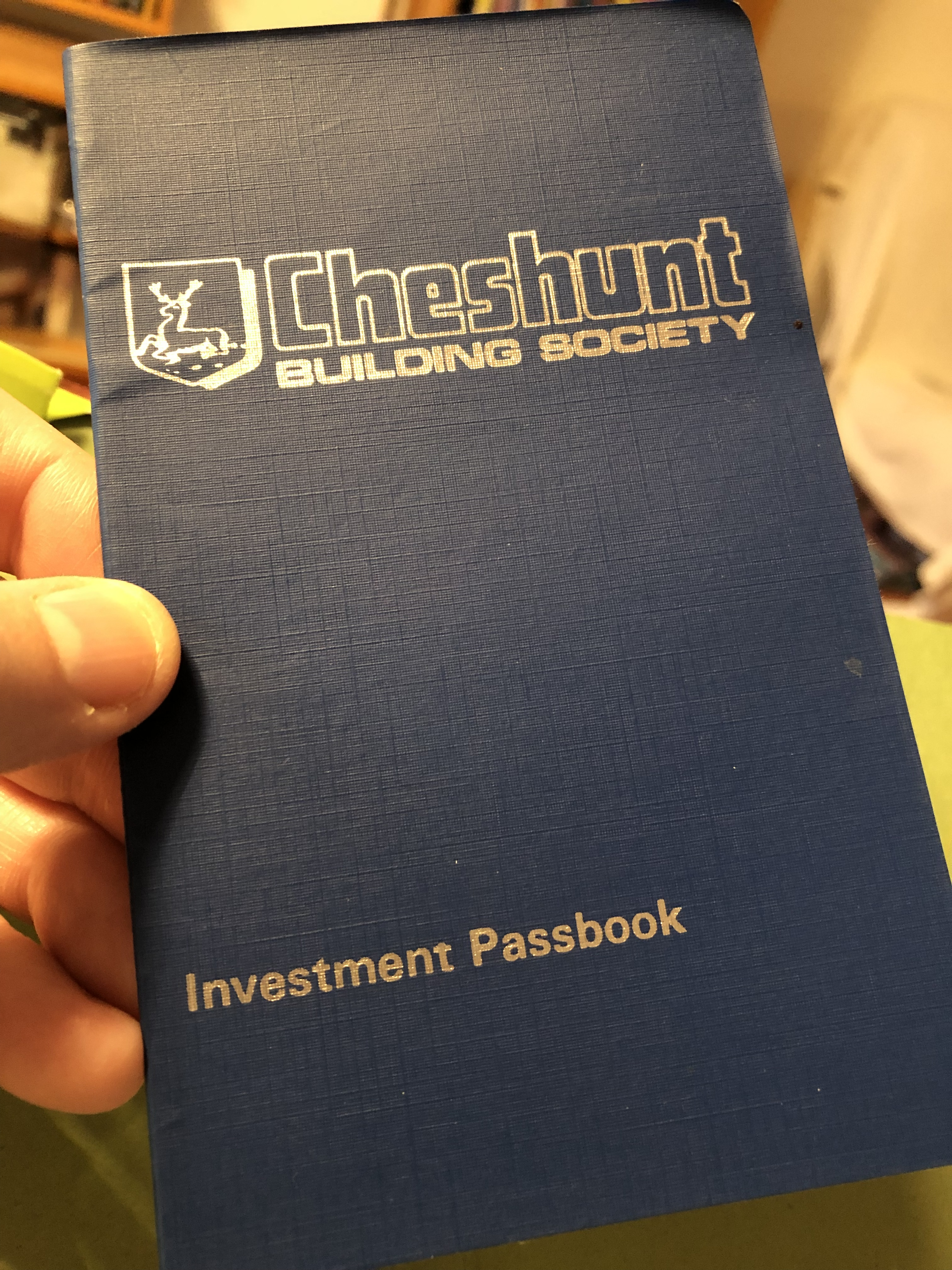
- Cheshunt Building Society passbook
- Company type: Building Society (Mutual)
- Industry: Financial services
- Founded: 1861
- Defunct: 1991
- Fate: Merged with Bristol and West Building Society
- Products: Savings, Mortgages

Cheshunt Building Society was a UK building society, which was founded in 1861. It merged with the Bristol and West Building Society on 30 December 1991.
