= Hanley Economic Building Society =

UK business

- Company type: Building society (mutual)
- Industry: Banking and financial services
- Founded: 1854
- Founder: Earl Granville
- Headquarters: Hanley, England
- Area served: Great Britain
- Key people: Mark Selby, CEO
- Services: Savings, mortgages, investments, loans, insurance
- Net income: £1.0 million GBP (August 2019)
- Total assets: £447 million GBP (August 2019)
- Number of employees: 80
- Divisions: Hanley Financial Services Ltd
- Subsidiaries: Hanley Mortgage Services Ltd
- Website: www.thehanley.co.uk

The Hanley Economic Building Society is a UK building society, which has its head office in Hanley, Stoke on Trent, Staffordshire. It is a member of the Building Societies Association.

Founded in 1854, the original name of the society was The Staffordshire Potteries Economic Permanent Benefit Building Society and later adopted its current name. It launched a 100% local rent to own mortgage product in 2025.

Coat of arms of Hanley Economic Building Society
Notes Granted 13 March 1972 Crest On a wreath of the colours a key in bend the wards uppermost and forming the letter H Gules surmounted by a key in bend sinister the wards uppermost forming the letter E Azure the shafts interlaced by a Stafford knot Or mantled partly Gules and Azure doubled party Argent and Or. Escutcheon Per chevron Gules and Azure bezanty in chief two clarions Or and in base a tower Argent. Supporters On either side a squirrel sejant Ermine about the neck a portcullis pendent from a chain Or. Motto Save Safely Build Surely
