= Stafford Building Society =

The Stafford Building Society
- Type: Building society (mutual)
- Industry: Banking and financial services
- Founded: 1877
- Headquarters: Stafford, England
- Area served: United Kingdom
- Key people: Steven Jones, Chief Executive
- Products: Savings, mortgages, investments,
- Net income: £6,190,000 GBP (October 2024),
- Total assets: £324million GBP (October 2024)
- Number of employees: 50+
- Website: srbs.co.uk

Former logo of the society

The Stafford Building Society is a British building society, which has its headquarters in Stafford, Staffordshire. It was formed by a small group of railway workers of the London & North Western Railway Company in 1877. It was known as Stafford Railway Building Society until it rebranded on 1 March 2024. It is a member of the Building Societies Association.
