= Saffron Building Society =

Regional building society in the East of England

- Type: Building society (mutual)
- Industry: Banking and financial services
- Founded: January 1849
- Headquarters: Saffron Walden, England, UK
- Number of locations: 8
- Key people: Nick Treble, Chairman Colin Field, Chief Executive Officer
- Products: Savings, mortgages, investments, loans, insurance
- Net income: £3.1 million GBP (December 2007), 84.6% on 2006
- Total assets: £784 million GBP (December 2007), 10.4% on 2006
- Number of employees: 181
- Website: www.saffronbs.co.uk

The Saffron Building Society is a regional building society which has branches and agencies in the East of England, spanning Essex, Hertfordshire and Suffolk. It is a member of the Building Societies Association.

== History ==
Saffron Building Society was established in Saffron Walden, Essex, in 1849. It began life as the Saffron Walden Second Building Society and was founded by the Revd John Marten, who became the first Secretary.

The society acquired the Saffron Walden and Essex Mechanics Permanent Building Society in 1968. It then bought Royston & District Building Society and became the Saffron Walden & District Building Society in 1972. It merged with the London and Essex Building Society (previously North Bow & Manor Park) and became the Saffron Walden & Essex Building Society in 1979. After that, it merged with the Herts & Essex Building Society based in Bishop's Stortford and became the Saffron Walden, Herts & Essex Building Society in 1989. Finally, it changed its name to Saffron Building Society in 2006.

In 2019, it closed branches in Sawbridgeworth, Great Dunmow and Frinton, reducing its network to eight branches in Bishop's Stortford, Brentwood, Colchester, Halstead, Haverhill, Royston, Saffron Walden and Ware.
