= Chorley Building Society =

British building society

- Company type: Building Society (Mutual)
- Industry: Banking; Financial services
- Founded: 7 March 1859
- Headquarters: Chorley, England
- Number of locations: 3
- Area served: United Kingdom
- Key people: Chief Executive – Stephen Penlington
- Products: Savings, Mortgages and Insurance
- Total assets: ▲£427.5 million GBP (February 2025)
- Members: circa 28,000 (February 2024)
- Number of employees: 79 (February 2025)
- Website: chorleybs.co.uk

The Chorley and District Building Society, trading as Chorley Building Society, is a British building society based in Chorley, Lancashire, England. It is a member of the Building Societies Association. As a building society, it operates under the principle of mutuality, meaning it is owned by its members rather than shareholders.

The society has three branches, including a Head Office located on Foxhole Road, High Street in Chorley, and Towngate in Leyland.

Key House Head Office and Branch

== History ==
The society established as The Chorley & District Building Society on 7 March 1859.

== Awards ==
ESG Initiative of the Year Winner 2024

Chorley Building Society has received significant recognition for its services and initiatives in recent years. Notable achievements include:

- MoneyAge Mortgage Awards 2024
- Mortgage Lender Survey 2024
- MoneyAge Awards 2023
- British Bank Awards 2023
- MoneyAge Awards 2022
- Smart Money People
