= Holmesdale =

Holmesdale may refer to:

- Baron Amherst of Holmesdale in the County of Kent
- Vale of Holmesdale, in Surrey and Kent, England
  - Holmesdale Building Society, founded in Reigate, Surrey
  - The Holmesdale School in Snodland, Kent
- Holmesdale, Derbyshire, England
