= Furness Building Society =

British financial institution

Coordinates: 54.1120°N 3.2287°W

Furness Building Society (FBS)
- Type: Building Society (Mutual)
- Industry: Banking and Financial Services
- Founded: 28 October 1865
- Headquarters: Barrow-in-Furness, United Kingdom
- Number of locations: 10
- Key people: Simon Broadley (Chief Executive Officer)
- Products: Savings, Mortgages, Investments, Loans, Credit Cards, Insurance
- Net income: £4 million (2022) ▲£1.7 million (2010)
- Total assets: ▲£1,236 million (2022) ▲£813 million (2010)
- Number of employees: 182
- Website: www.furnessbs.co.uk

Furness Building Society is a British building society, which has its headquarters in Barrow-in-Furness, Cumbria, England. It is the 18th largest in the United Kingdom based on total assets of £813 million as at 31 December 2010. Total assets increased to £1.2 billion by 2022. It is a member of the Building Societies Association.

== History ==
Established in 1865, the society expanded its call centre in 2009 to deal with investments and insurance queries. The Society has two wholly owned subsidiary companies: Furness Mortgage Services Ltd and Furness Independent Financial Advisers. In 2017, Chris Harrison was appointed as the CEO of Furness Building Society.
