= Swansea Building Society =

- Company type: Building Society (Mutual)
- Industry: Banking; Financial services
- Founded: 6 February 1923
- Headquarters: Swansea, Wales, UK
- Key people: Stephen Maddock, Non-Executive Chairman; Alun Williams, Chief Executive; Nathan Griffiths, Director of Finance; Catherine Griffiths, Director of Risk and Compliance
- Products: Savings, Mortgages, Loans
- Net income: £6.2m GBP (December 2023), ▲14.9% on 2022
- Total assets: £607.0m GBP (December 2023), ▲14.5% on 2022
- Number of employees: 80
- Website: www.swansea-bs.co.uk

The Swansea Building Society, is an independent mutual building society based in Swansea, Wales. It is a member of the Building Societies Association.

== History ==
The Society was founded by local estate agent John Oliver Watkins in February 1923.

Swansea Building Society benefited from the Icelandic financial crisis in 2009, as local savers looked to invest in a safer institution. The society opened a new branch outside Swansea city centre for the first time in its history. In May 2010, the society launched a savings account in partnership with Swansea City A.F.C., earning the club additional revenue through commission.
