= Melton Building Society =

Financial institution based in Melton Mowbray, Leicestershire

- Company type: Building Society (Mutual)
- Industry: Banking; Financial services
- Founded: 1875
- Headquarters: Melton Mowbray, England
- Number of locations: 5
- Key people: Simon Taylor (chief executive)
- Products: Savings, Mortgages, Insurance and Financial Advice
- Net income: £13.2m (2022)
- Total assets: £714 million GBP (December 2022)
- Number of employees: 141
- Subsidiaries: MBS Lending Ltd, Nexa Finance Ltd, MMBS Services Ltd
- Website: www.themelton.co.uk

The Melton Building Society is a building society based in Melton Mowbray, Leicestershire in the East Midlands. It was established in 1875. It provides mortgages, savings, insurance and investment products from its principal office and three branches in Melton Mowbray, Oakham and Grantham. The Society is a member of the Building Societies Association. Melton Building Society is a mutual organisation owned by its more than 40,000 members.
