= First Active =

Irish bank

First Active Plc
- Industry: Bank
- Founded: 1861; 165 years ago
- Defunct: 2010
- Headquarters: Formerly throughout Ireland, HQ in Dublin
- Number of employees: 700 (2004)
- Parent: Ulster Bank Group
- Website: www.firstactive.ie

First Active Plc was an Irish bank and former building society which was merged into Ulster Bank in late 2009, ceasing trading in February 2010. It traditionally offered a range of mortgages (including subprime mortgages), savings, investment, pension and life assurance products, but from 2007 onwards, also offered credit cards, ATM accounts and current accounts as well as online banking and Laser/Maestro debit cards.

== History ==
The organisation was founded as the Workingman's Benefit Building Society in 1861, and it was legally incorporated in 1875. Renamed First National Building Society in 1960, it became the first building society in Ireland to open a branch network, and during the 1970s and 1980s several other smaller building societies merged their business into that of First National. From the 1990s, it used an advertising campaign which involved contradicting received wisdom about finance. Examples included a representative telling "most people" that there's no need to keep switching mortgage companies, finding "whoever said that you need to keep switching mortgages in order to get the best deal", and finding where it is written that it takes ages to get a decision on your mortgage.

The society demutualised in 1998 and was listed on the Irish and London Stock Exchanges under the new name of First Active plc. It was acquired by Royal Bank of Scotland Group in 2004. In 2004, Tesco Bank also began offering products provided by First Active.

On 26 January 2009, it was announced that First Active would cease to operate as a separate entity and its operations would be merged with those of Ulster Bank, with the loss of 750 jobs (550 in the Republic of Ireland and 200 in Northern Ireland). From September 2009, it ceased offering any new products to customers in preparation for the merger.

== 2026 relaunch ==
In early August 2026, NatWest Group relaunched the First Active brand as a new, completely digital savings service in the United Kingdom.

The service offers an instant-access savings account targeted at customers wanting to manage their finances online, with no minimum balance requirement up to a maximum of £1 million, at “competitive” savings rates (for instant access savings accounts) of 4.5% (at launch) annual equivalent rate (AER) compared to the market average of 2.11% AER. The savings rate comprises a base variable rate of 3% and a 1.5% bonus for the first 12 months.

Because the service is online-only, there is no in-branch support and customers can only manage their accounts via email, web chat and telephone support.

First Active operates as a trading name of National Westminster Bank plc and is part of NatWest Group.

== See also ==
- List of banks in the Republic of Ireland
