= Monmouthshire Building Society =

- Type: Building Society (Mutual)
- Industry: Banking; Financial services
- Founded: 23 January 1869
- Headquarters: Newport, Wales, UK
- Number of locations: 29
- Key people: Will Carroll, Chief Executive Officer
- Products: Savings, Mortgages
- Members: 70,860 (November 2016)
- Number of employees: 145
- Website: www.monbs.com

Monmouthshire Building Society is a building society based in Newport, Wales. It was founded as the Monmouthshire and South Wales Permanent Investment Benefit Building Society in 1869. The society sold its insurance subsidiary, Monmouthshire Insurance Services, to Thomas Carroll Group in April 2016.
