= Tipton & Coseley Building Society =

- Company type: Building Society (Mutual)
- Industry: Banking; Financial services
- Founded: 1 May 1901
- Headquarters: Tipton, England
- Products: Savings, Mortgages, Investments, Loans, Insurance
- Website: www.thetipton.co.uk

The Tipton & Coseley Building Society is a British building society, which has its head office in Tipton, West Midlands. The society was established in 1901. The society entered into a contract with a London-based start-up, Mast, to provide a new loan origination platform in December 2024.

Its headquarters are in Owen Street, Tipton town centre, with other branches in Coseley, Bilston and Sedgley. It added a branch in Codsall in September 2025.
