= Suomen AsuntoHypoPankki =

Finnish bank

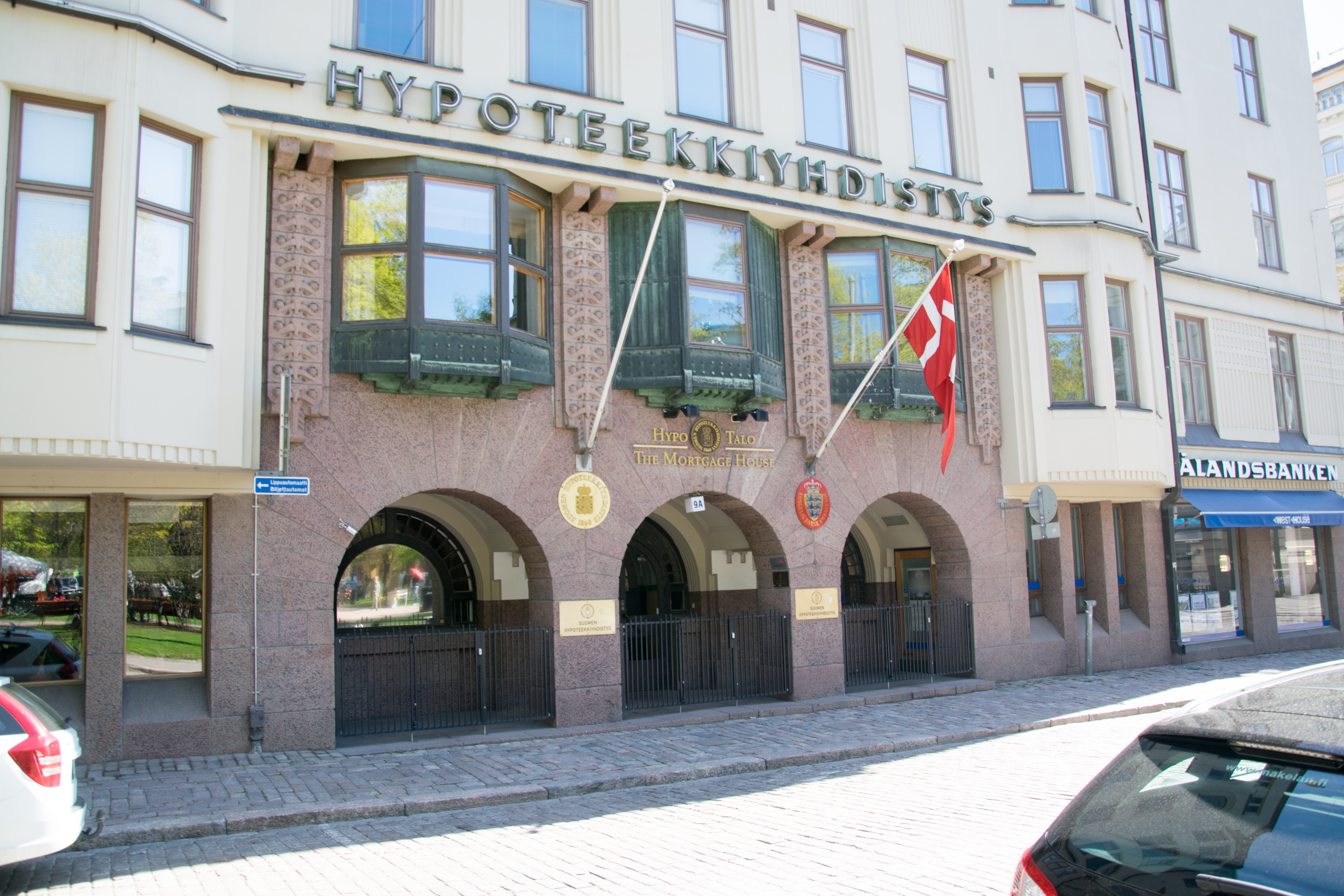
- Head office
- Type: Private
- Industry: Financial services
- Founded: 2002
- Headquarters: Helsinki, Finland
- Area served: Finland
- Products: mortgage lending
- Revenue: EUR 48.3 million (2006)
- Net income: ▲EUR 18.7 million (2006)
- Parent: The Mortgage Society of Finland (100%)
- Website: www.hypo.fi

Suomen AsuntoHypoPankki is a Finnish bank specialized in mortgage lending. The parent company of Suomen AsuntoHypoPankki is Suomen Hypoteekkiyhdistys (lit. The Mortgage Society of Finland), a building society established in 1860. The Mortgage Society has more than 10,000 members.

== See also ==
- List of banks in Finland
