= Hinckley and Rugby Building Society =

- Type: Building Society (Mutual)
- Industry: Banking; Financial services
- Founded: 1983
- Headquarters: Hinckley, England
- Number of locations: 12
- Key people: Chief Executive - Barry Carter
- Products: Savings, Mortgages
- Website: hrbs.co.uk

Hinckley and Rugby Building Society is a building society based in Hinckley, Leicestershire, UK. It dates from a merger in 1983, with origins claimed to date back to 1861.

== History ==
Hinckley and Rugby Building Society's history dates back to 1861 when the Rugby Provident Building Society was founded.

The Hinckley Freehold Land and Permanent Building Society opened for business in November 1865, managed by Thomas Kiddle from his draper's shop in Castle Street, Hinckley.

The Society can still be found to this day at 37 Castle Street, a Grade II listed building dating back to the 18th century.

In 1982, Hinckley Building Society agreed to merge with the Rugby Provident Building Society and, on 1 March 1983 it became Hinckley & Rugby Building Society.

By the end of 2017 the Hinckley & Rugby Building Society had mortgage lending of £193 million and a retail savings balance of £576 million.

Colin Fyfe, formerly Chief Executive of the Darlington Building Society, became Chief Executive of Hinckley & Rugby in November 2018, taking over following the retirement of Chris White, who had held the post for the previous 11 years.

In June 2019 the Society moved to a new state-of-the-art Head Office in Upper Bond Street, Hinckley, after acquiring and converting the former Hinckley Magistrates Court building.
