= Manchester Building Society =

Financial services brand

- Type: Building society (mutual)
- Industry: Banking; Financial services
- Founded: 1922
- Headquarters: Manchester, England
- Products: Savings
- Parent: Newcastle Building Society (since 2023)
- Website: www.themanchester.co.uk

The Manchester Building Society is a British financial services brand that operates as a trading name of Newcastle Building Society which offers savings accounts. Reporting its intention to retain the use of the Manchester Building Society brand beyond that date, the society announced that it had completed its merger with Newcastle Building Society on 1 July 2023.

== History ==
The society was founded in 1922. It established its head office at 24 Queen Street from where it traded for nearly a century.

The society bought Whiteaway Laidlaw Bank from Home Retail Group in March 2007. In February 2011, private investors led by RBS Equity Finance, which was later spun off from the Royal Bank of Scotland Group and became Pollen Street Capital, bought Whiteaway Laidlaw Bank.

After concerns about its capital adequacy, the society ceased lending to customers in 2013.

The society's management took former auditor, Grant Thornton, to court, claimed it had acted negligently and ultimately caused the capitalisation concerns. Towards the end of 2018, they were awarded a negligible sum versus the initial claim, and forced to pay Grant Thornton's costs which were far in excess of the award. The society took this decision to the Supreme Court where, in June 2021, the lower court's decision was overturned.

In February 2023 it was confirmed that the society had agreed to merge with the Newcastle Building Society. The merger was completed on 1 July 2023.
