= Nelson Building Society =

Building society in New Zealand

- Company type: Building society (Mutual)
- Industry: Financial services
- Founded: 1862
- Headquarters: Nelson, Nelson, New Zealand
- Number of locations: 8 branches
- Area served: South Island, New Zealand
- Website: http://www.nbs.co.nz

NBS (or Nelson Building Society) is the oldest building society in New Zealand. The head office is located in Nelson, New Zealand.

NBS provides personal, business and community banking services to local people, including transactional and savings accounts, term investments and home and business loans. They have eight branches located in the high streets of Nelson, Richmond, Motueka, Tākaka, Murchison, Westport, Greymouth and Ashburton.

As a ‘mutual’ institution, NBS is owned by its clients and reinvests its profits back into the community through sponsorships and grants to sporting, arts, health, educational, and environmental organisations. NBS has invested over $8 million back into the community over the last 10 years.

== History ==
The Permanent Building Society of Nelson was founded in 1862. During a period of rapid growth in the region, its purpose was to help people into homes and support new business.

In 2022 NBS celebrated 160 years of continuous service to its communities.

== Branches ==
NBS has eight branches, all located in the South Island. The branches are located in:

- Nelson
- Richmond
- Motueka
- Murchison
- Westport
- Greymouth
- Tākaka
- Ashburton

== Community sponsorship and grants ==
NBS provides sponsorship and grants to not for profit organisations and groups who operate in the regions that they serve. Recipients of sponsorship and grants include Nelson Giants, the Tasman Rugby Union, the Brook Waimārama Sanctuary, Nelson-Tasman Hospice along with many smaller grass roots organisations such as the Kawatiri Group Riding for the Disabled, the Golden Bay Community Service Vehicle Trust and Cultural Conversations.
