= Bath Building Society =

Building society based in Bath, England

Bath Investment & Building Society
- Trade name: Bath Building Society
- Company type: Building society (mutual)
- Industry: Banking and financial services
- Founded: 1904
- Headquarters: Bath, Somerset, England
- Number of locations: 2
- Area served: United Kingdom
- Key people: Richard Ingle (Chief Executive); Joanne Evan’s (Chair)
- Products: Savings; Mortgages
- Total assets: ▲£324.1 million GBP (December 2018)
- Website: bathbuildingsociety.co.uk

Bath Investment & Building Society, trading as Bath Building Society, is a building society, with headquarters in Bath, England. Set up in 1904 as a friendly society, the society now focuses on savings and mortgages. The mortgage business specialises in offering niche residential mortgage products to meet the individual demands of customers. Popular products include rent-a-room and buy for university mortgages as well as products targeted at first-time buyers and retired customers. It is a member of the Building Societies Association.
