= Ketley's Building Society =

- Company type: Defunct
- Industry: Financial services
- Founded: 1775
- Founder: Richard Ketley
- Headquarters: Golden Cross Inn, Snow Hill, Birmingham, England
- Area served: United Kingdom
- Key people: Richard Ketley
- Products: Mutual savings and housing finance

Ketley's Building Society, founded in Birmingham, England, in 1775, was the world's first building society.

The society was formed by Richard Ketley, the landlord at the Golden Cross inn at 60 Snow Hill. Taverns and coffeehouses were important meeting places in eighteenth century Birmingham and frequently formed the focal point for clubs and societies.

Ketley's Building Society existed to pool the resources of its members, who would contribute a specified amount into a shared building fund and draw lots to select which of the members would have land purchased and a home constructed. With property in place as security, further finance could be attracted to the society through loans at a reasonable cost.

The only documentary records of the society are three advertisements offering shares in the society that appeared in local newspapers in 1778 and 1779. The third of these advertisements claimed that £80 had been advanced on the society's shares.
