= Loughborough Building Society =

UK-based financial services provider

- Company type: Building Society (Mutual)
- Industry: Banking; Financial services
- Founded: 1867
- Headquarters: Loughborough, England
- Number of locations: 5
- Products: Savings, mortgages, investments, insurance
- Number of employees: 85 (2023)
- Website: www.theloughborough.co.uk

The Loughborough Building Society is a UK-based financial services provider headquartered in Loughborough, Leicestershire. In 2023 it reported assets of about £533 million.

The Society was founded by local businessmen as the Loughborough Permanent Investment, Land and Building Society in 1867.

As of 2023, the Society maintains four branches: in Loughborough, Derby, Long Eaton, and Anstey. There is also an agency in Southwell.
