= Leeds City Credit Union =

Financial co-operative in Leeds, England

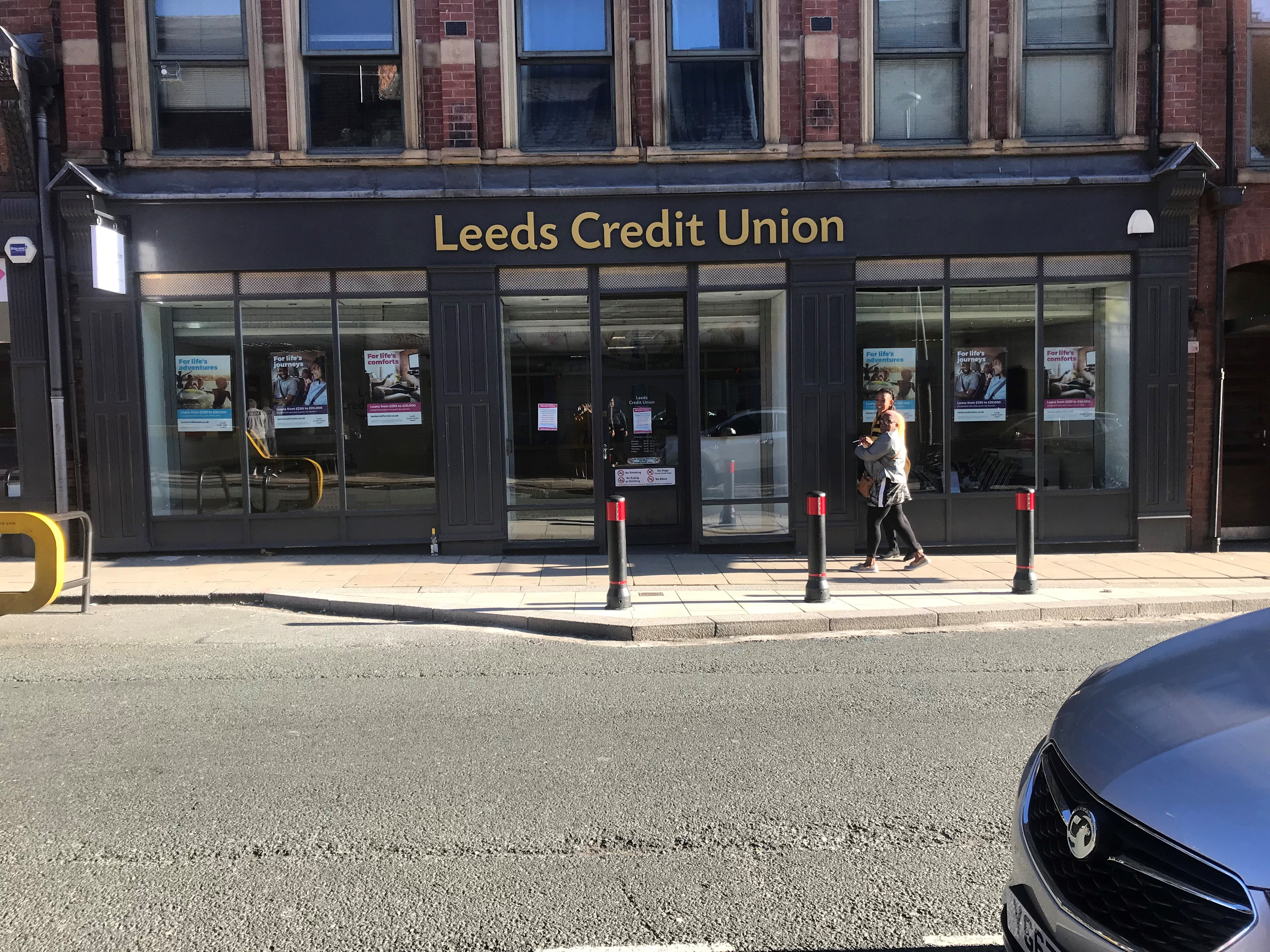
- The Leeds city centre branch
- Founded: 1987
- Type: Credit Union
- Location: Carlton Tower, 34 St Paul's St, Leeds LS1 2QB
- Key people: James Brown, Chief Executive
- Website: leedscreditunion.co.uk

Leeds City Credit Union Limited is a not-for-profit member-owned financial co-operative, trading as Leeds Credit Union, formed in 1987 and based in the West Yorkshire city of Leeds.

== History ==
The credit union began life as the Leeds Council Employees Credit Union, offering savings and loans to local authority staff, in 1987.

While continuing to serve members from 2006 to 2008, Leeds City Credit Union experienced a number of management and governance challenges. This led to an independent review of governance and the appointment of a new management team and a number of new directors.

Since 2009, Leeds City Credit Union has re-emerged as the country's largest credit union with over 35,000 members. In 2012, members adopted a new constitution to take advantage of The Legislative Reform (Industrial and Provident Societies and Credit Unions) Order 2010. This has given the credit union new powers including the ability to extend its common bond to employers and organisations outside Leeds, to offer business accounts and interest on savings. In 2013, Leeds City Credit Union selected Intermarketing Agency as its marketing agency, following a pitch process.

In 2014, Lloyds Bank piloted a project in conjunction with Leeds City to encourage its staff to direct customers towards credit unions. It was awarded a grant of £50,000 by the Lloyds Banking Group Credit Union Development Fund to help support its reserves and enable it to bring forward plans for growth more quickly.

In July 2015, Leeds City Credit Union became members of Leeds Citizens, a new diverse alliance of organisations which aims to campaign for social justice and the common good. On 3 September 2015, Economic Secretary to the Treasury, Harriett Baldwin visited the credit union to discuss the important role that credit unions play in the financial sector. On 11 September 2015, a Your Loan Shop information point at the Compton Centre, Leeds was officially opened by LCC Executive Member for Communities, Cllr. Debra Coupar (Lab. Cross Gates and Whinmoor) and rising Leeds Rhinos RLFC star, Liam Sutcliffe.

=== Mergers ===
Seacroft Credit Union (established 1997) transferred engagements to Leeds City Credit Union in 2001, followed by Skyrack Credit Union (established 1991 as South Headingley and Burley Savings and Co-operative Credit Union) and Halton Moor Co-operative Savings and Credit Union (established 1988) in 2002. More recently, White Rose Credit Union (established 1997 and incorporating the engagements of United Stream Credit Union) transferred in 2014.

== Activities ==
Registered under the Industrial and Provident Societies Acts, Leeds City Credit Union is governed by a volunteer board of directors who are elected at the Annual General Meeting.

In June 2015, Leeds City Council teamed up with the credit union to as part of a scheme to tackle empty homes. Leeds City Credit Union also has two other customer facing outlets named 'Your Loan Shop'. For August and September 2014, Your Loan Shop had 364 visits in person and 118 web enquiries, resulting in 103 loans being issued to the value of £87,718.

Membership of Leeds City Credit Union is restricted by common bond to individuals living or working in the cities of Leeds, Wakefield, the London Borough of Barking & Dagenham and Harrogate where it continues to trade under the White Rose name in partnership with Harrogate Borough Council. Residents of certain housing associations and staff of select employers are also eligible to join.

=== Products ===
Leeds City Credit Union runs a payroll deduction savings and loans scheme in conjunction with Leeds City Council and select local employers. The credit union is responsible for the operation of the scheme, with the employer facilitating monthly deductions from salary. A payment card, accepted at Post Office and PayPoint outlets, can also be issued to members on request. Leeds City Credit Union is authorised by the Prudential Regulation Authority and regulated by the Financial Conduct Authority and PRA. Ultimately, like the banks and building societies, members' savings are protected against business failure by the Financial Services Compensation Scheme.

== See also ==
- Association of British Credit Unions
- Credit unions in the United Kingdom
- British co-operative movement
