= Nationwide UK (Ireland) =

UK building society's operations in Ireland, 2009–2017

Nationwide UK (Ireland), part of Nationwide Building Society, had a retail outlet in Merrion Row in Dublin city centre, however its business was mostly online, by post or by phone. Amongst the products offered to its customers were UK Sterling savings accounts. It closed its only branch, with loss of 22 jobs, in April 2017.
