= Terminating deposit =

Terminating deposits were a form of savings-and-loan that were one of the key products of the early building society movement in the UK and from there they spread through what is now the Commonwealth. They were banned in the UK around 1910, and are now illegal everywhere, the last vestiges being seen in New Zealand.

The key features were:

1. terminating deposits were open to subscription by depositors for a period of time until the required number of depositors to make it viable had been found. Then the Group as it was known would be closed off and subsequent applicants would be enrolled into the next group.
2. depositors were contracted to make a small deposit on a regular basis e.g. weekly or monthly (similar to insurance savings policies)
3. no interest was received on these deposits
4. whenever the group had enough funds a ballot would be held of all depositors who were up to date with payments. The ballot prize was an interest free mortgage loan for around 60% of the value of a house (in line with the local rules for trustee investments).

Characteristically the groups had a lifespan of 20–25 years and no ballots would be held in the first 10 years while funds built up. By the time ballots started after 10 years, ballot winners would normally have enough funds saved to cover the 40% contribution to buy a house with the other 60% coming from the interest free mortgage.

As originally established some depositors would never receive a mortgage (win a ballot) i.e. the number of ballots over the life of the scheme was less than the number of depositors.

This scheme is situated in the conditions of the working class at the time they were devised in the late 18th century and the working class self-help movement which also gave rise to trade unions, the co-operative movement etc. Working-class people did not have access to the banking system, nor did their self-help enterprises. Accordingly, the terminating deposit product had to be designed in such a way that it did not depend in any way on the wider financial markets and in particular it did not involve any borrowing by the building society which promoted it. It had to be totally self-funding at every stage of its life cycle. In its original format ballots were only held when there was sufficient money in the kitty to provide an interest free mortgage to the winner. If there weren't enough funds there was no ballot and this ability to turn off the balloting tap made the product very resilient. The groups were able to survive prolonged economic depressions by simply not holding any ballots until things got better. Whilst working-class families aspired to own their own home, they didn't have access to the banking system, and they could not realistically expect to save enough in their working life to buy one. Accordingly, they were willing to enter terminating deposit schemes which did not guarantee them a house in exchange for their savings, but where a mechanism by which some members of the scheme would get one, through the chance element of the ballot.

== Demise ==
In Britain terminating deposit schemes were outlawed by statute between 1900 and 1910. The reason appears to have been that they relied heavily on the integrity of the organisers and, if this was not present, they were open to many abuses which left depositors out of pocket or dissatisfied. Similar legislation was passed over the following decades throughout the commonwealth with the last appearing to be in New Zealand in 1980/81. After this date no new schemes could be launched but due to the long life of the product some pre-1980 groups continued to exist to beyond 2000. By this stage the product and its administration was a far cry from the original concept. The factors contributing to this were:

1. the implosion of the building society movement which saw it change through a rapid process of mergers and takeovers from an independent society in most large towns to a few large national societies between 1970 & 1990.
2. the conversion of the biggest of these national societies to banks in the 1980s and 90s
3. strong competition between societies from the 1960s on which saw rival societies make drastic changes to the product to make their version more attractive than their rivals. These innovations included the introductions of guaranteed monthly ballots, balloting at an earlier stage in the life of the group (less than 10 years) and a guaranteed interest-free mortgage for every depositor at maturity of the group, if they had not won one earlier.
4. There is some evidence that these changes in product features undermined the economic model of the product so that groups were no longer financially independent throughout their life cycle as per the original product but instead funds were used from later groups to support the cash flow of earlier groups. This meant that when new groups were prohibited by statute the position became untenable. Administrators began treating the total of terminating deposit money as a whole rather than a series of separate groups so in effect well performing groups cross-subsidised other groups.
5. The size of the loan available via ballot wins became insufficient to buy a house due to inflation of house prices during the 25 year life of the group
6. Freeing up of financial markets and general increases in prosperity had seen mortgages become widely available through banks to anyone who was credit-worthy.
7. After no more groups could be created, knowledge of how they were supposed to work was progressively lost, rule changes during the merger and product changes phases did not keep up with the features of the product so that there arose an increasing grey area where the society rules were no longer clear about how they should be operated.
8. Above all many depositors who had been pressured by door to door salespeople to start subscribing chose not to continue and simply abandoned the money they had saved, which had become a minor sum due to inflation.

== See also ==
- Starr-Bowkett Society
