= Mutual organization =

Organization based on mutual benefit

A mutual organization, also mutual society or simply mutual, is an organization (which is often, but not always, a company or business) based on the principle of mutuality and governed by private law. Unlike a cooperative, members usually do not directly contribute to the capital of the organization, but derive their right to profits and votes through their customer relationship.

A mutual exists with the purpose of raising funds from its membership or customers (collectively called its members), which can then be used to provide common services to all members of the organization or society. A mutual is therefore owned by, and run for the benefit of, its members – it has no external shareholders to pay in the form of dividends, and as such does not usually seek to maximize and make large profits or capital gains. Mutuals exist for the members to benefit from the services they provide and often do not pay income tax.

Surplus revenue made will usually be re-invested in the mutual to sustain or grow the organization, though some mutuals operate a dividend scheme similar to a cooperative.

Adderley defines a mutual as: “a business owned and democratically controlled, equally, by its members, who fund it through the purchase of products or services it provides exclusively to them, with profits generally retained.”

== Background ==
The primary form of financial business set up as a mutual company in the United States has been mutual insurance. Some insurance companies are set up as stock companies and then mutualized, their ownership passing to their policy owners. In mutual insurance companies, what would have been profits are instead rebated to the clients in the form of dividend distributions, reduced future premiums or paid up additions to the policy value.

This is a competitive advantage to such companies—the idea of owning a piece of the company could be more attractive to some potential clients than the idea of being a source of profits for investors. In the typical stock company, profits go to shareholders. In contrast, a mutual manages the company in the best interests of the customers. Furthermore, a mutual company is able to focus on a longer horizon than a typical company. Some mutual insurance companies make this claim explicitly.

In more general terms, mutual organizations are able to minimize the principal–agent problem by removing one stakeholder, the investor-owner, in favor of one of the other stakeholders, usually the customer, who becomes both user and joint owner of the business.

However, the mutual form of ownership also has disadvantages. One example is that mutual companies have no shares to sell and hence no access to equity markets.

At one time, most major U.S. life insurers were mutual companies. For many years, the tax status of such organizations was open to dispute, as they were technically nonprofit organizations. Eventually, it was agreed that federal taxation would be based on their share of business: for instance, in years in which mutual companies represented half of the business, they would be responsible for half of the taxes paid by the industry.

Many savings and loan associations were also mutual companies, owned by their depositors.

As a form of corporate ownership the mutual has fallen out of favor in the U.S. since the 1980s. Savings and loan industry deregulation and the late 1980s savings and loan crisis led many to change to stock ownership, or in some cases into banks. Many large U.S.-based insurance companies, such as the Prudential Insurance Company of America and the Metropolitan Life Insurance Company have demutualized, with shares of stock being distributed to their policyholders to represent the ownership interest they formerly had in the form of their interest as mutual policyholders.

The Mutual of Omaha Insurance Company has also investigated demutualization, even though its form of ownership is embedded in its name. It is noted that other formerly mutual companies such as Washington Mutual, a former savings and loan association, have been allowed to demutualize and yet retain their names.

The approximate British equivalent of the savings and loan is the building society. Building societies also went through an era of demutualisation in the 1980s and 1990s, leaving only one large national building society and around forty smaller regional and local ones. Significant demutualisation also occurred in Australia and South Africa in the same era.

Cooperatives are very similar to mutual companies. They tend to deal in primarily tangible goods and services such as agricultural commodities or utilities rather than intangible products such as financial services. Nevertheless, banking institutions with close ties to the co-operative movement are usually known as credit unions or cooperative banks rather than mutuals.

== Modern mutuality ==
Various types of financial institutions around the world are mutuals, and examples include:

- Mutual building societies
  - Nationwide Building Society – United Kingdom
  - Coventry Building Society – United Kingdom
  - Nelson Building Society – New Zealand
- Mutual banks and mutual savings banks
  - Greater Bank – Australia
  - SBS Bank – New Zealand
- Mutual healthcare providers
  - Benenden Healthcare Society – United Kingdom
- Mutual insurance companies
  - Shepherds Friendly Society – United Kingdom
  - Protection and indemnity insurance

Some mutual financial institutions offer services very similar to (if not the same as) those of a commercial bank. In some markets, mutuals offer very competitive interest rates and fee tariffs on savings and deposit accounts, mortgages and loans. The members who save and borrow with the mutual ultimately own the business.

== Conversion ==
Mutualization or mutualisation is the process by which a joint stock company changes legal form to a mutual organization or a cooperative, so that the majority of the stock is owned by employees or customers, thereafter known as members.

Demutualization or demutualisation is the reverse process, whereby a mutual may convert itself to a joint-stock company. In the United States, this process became increasingly common in the 1980s as a result of deregulation. Conversion may be full, to a public company, or in many states, partial, to a mutual holding company.

== See also ==
- Consumer cooperative
- Cooperative
- Corporatization
- Employee ownership
- Market socialism
- Mutualism (economic theory)
- Mutualism (movement)
- Producer cooperative
