= Metropolitan Public Gardens Association =

Public amenity charity in London

The Metropolitan Public Gardens Association (also known as the MPGA) is a charity in London for the purposes of the preservation of public parks and gardens, established in 1882. It facilitated the creation of new public open spaces, including from philanthropic landowners within its membership. The MPGA was involved in the formation and development of other amenity organisations. The charity still exists; in recent decades its emphasis has changed to smaller parcels of land and smaller projects within larger spaces, as well as to themed projects. The MPGA was the starting point for the careers of the ground-breaking female landscape gardeners Fanny Wilkinson and Madeline Agar.

== History ==
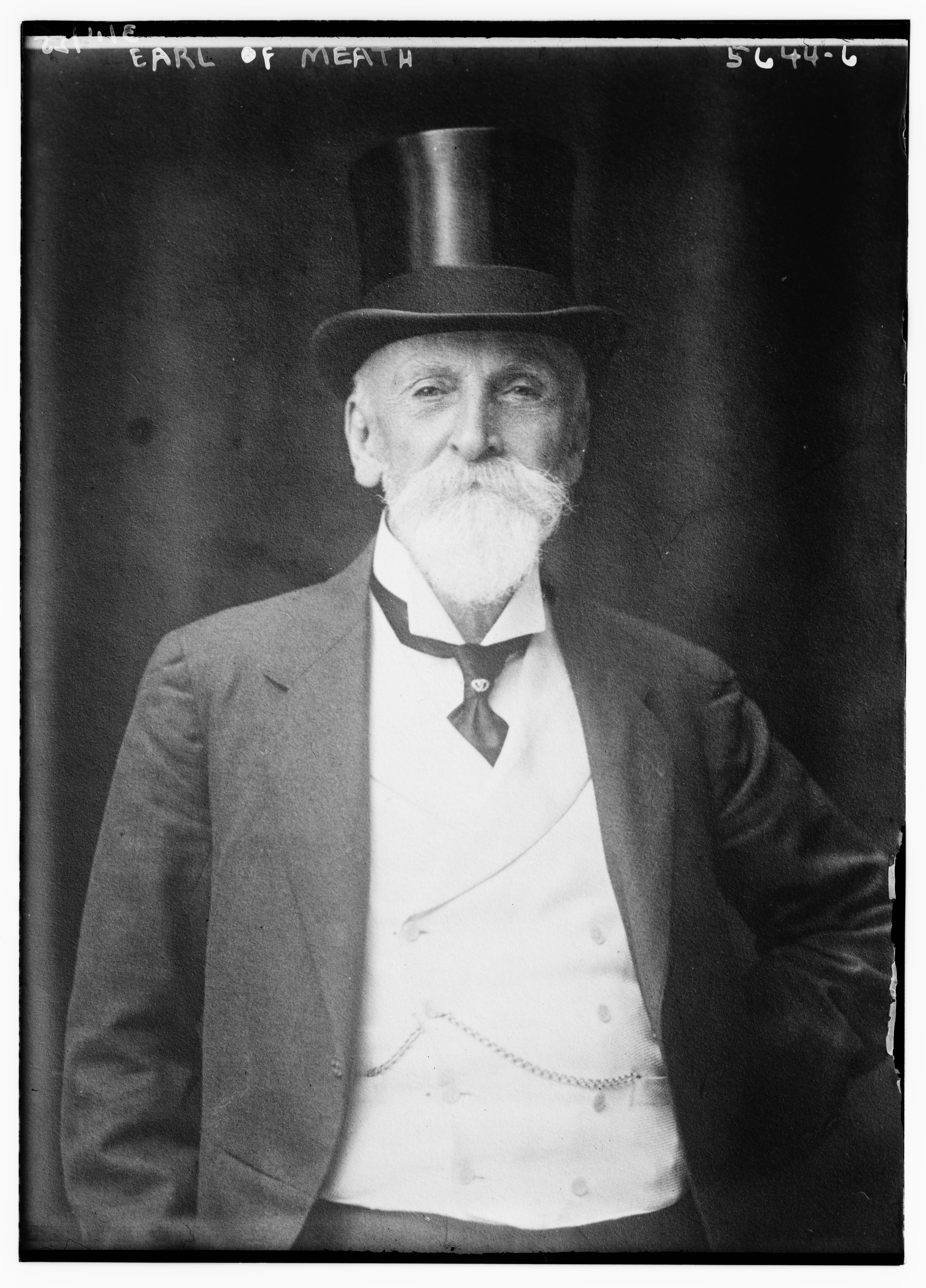
The 12th Earl of Meath

The Irish philanthropist Lord Brabazon (who, from 1887, was the 12th Earl of Meath) wanted to make more effort than the Kyrle Society (of which he was a member) was able to do to capitalise on the Metropolitan Open Spaces Act 1881. The Kyrle Society had been formed in 1876. The 1881 Act, which had been prompted by lobbying from Octavia Hill and the Kyrle Society, enabled disused burial grounds to be transferred to local authorities, together with the power to use public funds to maintain them as public gardens. In 1884 the Kyrle Society cleared and restored as public open space the derelict burial ground of St George's, Bloomsbury, north of Coram's Fields. The MPGA contributed £100 to the cost, but was not informed of the opening of St George's Gardens.

The MPGA was initially formed as the Metropolitan Public Gardens, Boulevard and Playground Association in 1882, before changing its name in 1885. The principal objects were stated to be the protection, preservation, safeguarding and acquiring for permanent preservation for public use, of gardens, disused burial grounds, churchyards, open spaces, or any land within the Metropolitan Police District, as well as the provision of seats and the planting of trees.

The creation of the MPGA was a direct consequence of the closure of London churchyards in the 1850s. In 1848-49 a cholera epidemic had killed 14,601 people in London and completely overwhelmed the existing burial system. The result was a series of Burial Acts (1852, 1853, 1855, 1857 and 1859) and the establishment of a second wave of publicly-run cemeteries in outer London, to complement the privately-run Magnificent Seven cemeteries that had been established after 1832. Nevertheless, only limited official use could be given to the closed burial grounds, until the Metropolitan Open Spaces Acts of 1877 and 1881, which made provisions for public use of burial grounds for exercise and recreation. It was this statutory provision that the MPGA stepped in to employ. The burial grounds remained consecrated, and the Open Spaces Act 1887, promoted by the MPGA, permitted the playing of sports and games on consecrated land with the consent of the bishop. The MPGA worked closely with the London County Council (established in 1889), which led to the London County Council (General Powers) Act 1910. The 1910 Act extended the LCC's powers in respect of burial grounds.

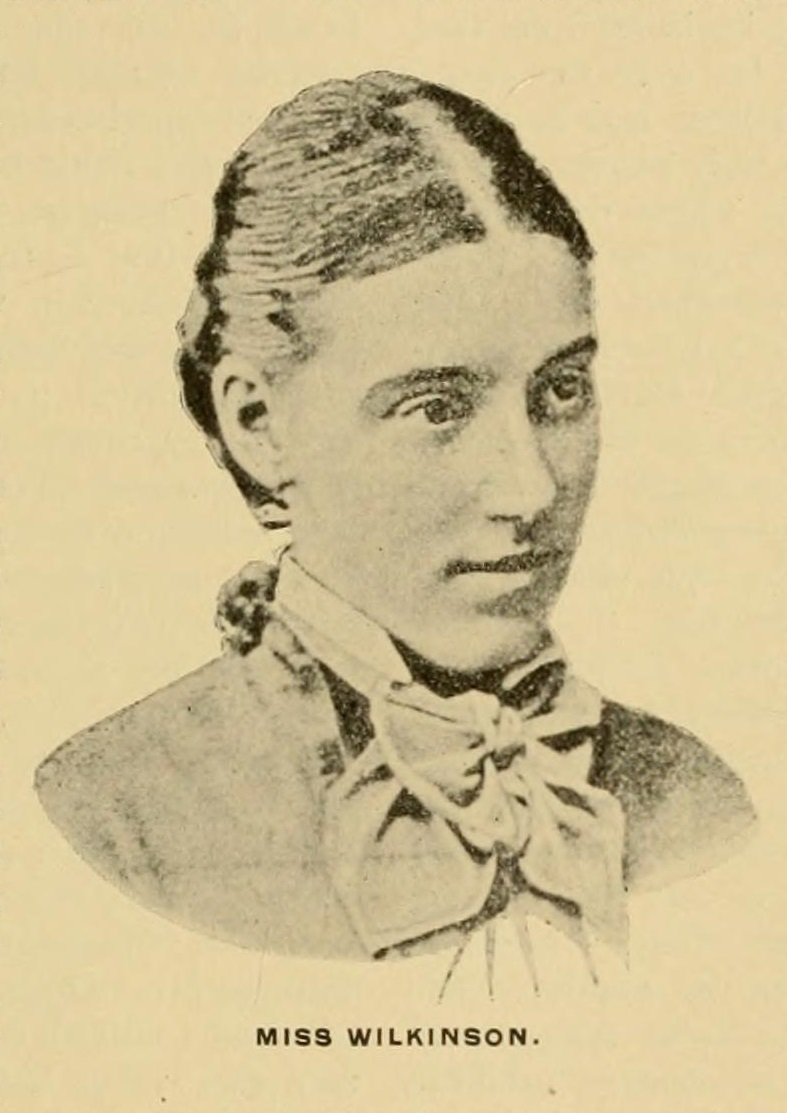
Fanny Wilkinson

After the initial focus on converting burial grounds to public gardens and recreation grounds, the MPGA turned its attention to the preservation of London squares. The result was the London Squares and Enclosures (Preservation) Act 1906, which protected 64 named squares, the London Squares Preservation Act 1931, which protected 461 named squares, and provisions in the Civic Amenities Act 1967, which introduced the concept of conservation areas, relevant for the impact on underground development beneath the squares.

Fanny Wilkinson was appointed the landscape gardener of the MPGA in 1884, and in 20 years laid out 75 public gardens for the MGPA. Two key features were the provision of drinking fountains and seats. The purpose of both of these was to dissuade people from public houses. Wilkinson left the MPGA in 1904. Her successor was Madeline Agar, who held the position for almost 25 years.

== Projects ==
=== Historic projects ===
The number of parks and gardens and other public spaces that the MPGA funded and developed is so extensive that a complete list would be almost impossible to compile. Many remain extant. The list of notable projects below is set out in chronological order of the MPGA's involvement, rather than the date of the open space itself.

- St John's Churchyard Garden, LB Lambeth, 1883. A Commissioners' Church built in 1824 to a design by Francis Bedford, St John's, Waterloo was built to commemorate the victory at Waterloo. The churchyard was converted into a garden in 1877. In 1883 Lord Brabazon gave a swing and giant stride as part of a children's playground; the MPGA itself provided parallel bars, a seesaw and six seats. In more recent years the garden had become neglected, but has since been restored. The playground equipment is no longer present.
- Ebury Square Garden, City of Westminster, 1884. Originally a private garden, the square was the first to be leased by the MPGA and was opened to the public in 1884. Although the records are sparse, it is likely that Fanny Wilkinson was responsible for the layout as she obtained funding from the MPGA for asphalt paths, costlier but more hard-wearing than gravel.
- Carlton Square, LB Tower Hamlets, 1885. Carlton Square was built as part of the Globe Fields Estate, which was developed between 1848 and 1855. The garden square was re-ordered by the MPGA as a garden with lawns, flower beds, walks, seats and a fountain, and was opened to the public in 1885 by Princess Louise. It was leased on an annual tenancy to the MPGA and maintained by the London County Council.
- Holy Trinity Churchyard, LB Southwark, 1885. Holy Trinity, Rotherhithe, was built between 1837-39 on land provided by the Surrey Commercial Dock Company. The churchyard was closed to burials in 1858, and was converted by the MPGA into a small public garden in 1885.
- Northampton Square Gardens, LB Islington, 1885. Northampton Square Gardens were opened to the public in 1885, with funding from the MPGA. Fanny Wilkinson designed the gardens, and included a drinking fountain and bandstand, both of which remain, as does a circle of London plane trees.
- Red Lion Square, LB Camden, 1885. Red Lion Square was laid out in the late 17th century as a speculative venture, taking its name from an inn. The square was 'beautified' pursuant to a 1737 Act of Parliament. Fanny Wilkinson laid it out as a public garden in 1885. In 1894 the trustees of the square passed the freehold to the MPGA, which, in turn, passed it to the London County Council free of cost.
- St Bartholomew's Gardens, LB Tower Hamlets, 1885. St Bartholomew the Less, Bethnal Green, was built in 1843-44 to a design by William Railton. After the churchyard was closed to burials, it was re-ordered by Fanny Wilkinson on behalf of the MPGA. In 1884 Wilkinson obtained a contractor’s estimate for either gravel paths or asphalt paths, the latter being more expensive. Gravel paths were initially provided, but two years later they were asphalted due to the number of visitors, estimated at 1,500 a day. Wilkinson retained one obelisk monument. The gardens were opened to the public by Princess Louise in 1885. Some of Wilkinson's iron railings remain in place.
- St Bartholomew-the-Great Churchyard, City of London, 1885. The priory church of St Bartholomew-the Great was established in 1123. At the Dissolution the nave was demolished, and the churchyard created in its place. The principal remaining area of the churchyard is a raised garden, which was laid out by Fanny Wilkinson in 1885.
- West Hackney Recreation Ground, LB Hackney, 1885. St James the Great, West Hackney, was built in 1825 to a design by Robert Smirke. After the closure of the churchyard, Fanny Wilkinson laid out a garden in 1885. Some of the London plane trees from the original layout remain.
- Paddington Street Gardens, City of Westminster, 1886. Two burial grounds (either side of Paddington Street) were closed to burials in 1814. The Association arranged for the burial grounds to be opened as a public recreation ground in 1885, and Fanny Wilkinson laid out the garden. It was opened by Princess Louise in 1886. The original lime trees and London plane trees survive.
- St James's Churchyard, LB Southwark, 1886. The most expensive of the churches built by the Commission for Building Fifty New Churches, St James's was designed by James Savage and built in 1827-29. The churchyard was closed to burials in 1855, and was then used for communal drying. It was converted to gardens by the MPGA, and opened to the public in 1886. An obelisk memorial and some chest-tombs were retained.
- St Paul's Churchyard, Shadwell, LB Tower Hamlets, 1886. St Paul's, Shadwell’s origins are as a chapel of ease to St Dunstan's, Stepney. After the churchyard closed to burials, it was laid out as a garden by Fanny Wilkinson on behalf of the MPGA in 1886. The design included a partially flagged area in front for recreation. Some London plane trees survive from the original design.
- Burgess Park, LB Southwark, 1887. Burgess Park was laid out after WWII pursuant to the principles of the Abercrombie Plan. In so doing, it incorporated the North Camberwell Open Space in 1965. That open space included the churchyard of St George's, Camberwell, which had been designed by Francis Bedford in 1824. The churchyard ceased to be used for burials in 1856. In 1886 it was acquired as a public open space by the MPGA and laid out as a public garden with funds provided by Viscountess Ossington. Mrs Gladstone opened the garden in 1887. After the churchyard was incorporated into the North Camberwell Open Space, it was re-landscaped in 1966. However, the church closed in 1970 and was allowed to become derelict. When the church was adapted to private housing in 1994, the garden was allowed to become a private garden.
- St Anne's Churchyard, Limehouse, LB Tower Hamlets, 1887. St Anne's, Limehouse, was built 1714-24 to a design by Nicholas Hawksmoor. After the churchyard closed to burials, it was converted to public gardens with the assistance of the MPGA. The garden was laid out by Fanny Wilkinson. She retained a notable stone pyramid by Hawksmoor.
- St Dunstan's Churchyard, Stepney, LB Tower Hamlets, 1887. Of Saxon origins, the church was rebuilt in the 15th century. The churchyard was extended in 1626 after an outbreak of plague caused 4,000 bodies to fill the ancient burial ground. Some 6,500 plague victims were buried in 1665-66. The churchyard closed to burials in 1854. Between 1885 and 1887 high ground around the church was dug away, and the MPGA converted it to a public garden, designed by Fanny Wilkinson. The MPGA bore the cost of conversion at £3,000. The garden was opened by the Duchess of Leeds in 1887.
- St Martin-in-the-Fields Churchyard, City of Westminster, 1887. Most of the former churchyard of St Martin-in-the-Fields has been lost to development, but two small parcels survived, to the north and east of the church. Unusually for the MPGA, it paved them with flagstones as well as planted them with trees. The churchyard was then opened to the public in 1887. For many years covered in market stalls, the churchyard has been restored including with the provision of seating.
- Holy Trinity churchyard, Mile End, LB Tower Hamlets, 1887. The churchyard closed to burials in 1853, and was converted to a public garden by the MPGA in 1887.
- Edward Square, LB Islington, 1888. Originally a private garden, it was acquired by the local vestry pursuant to the Open Spaces Act 1887 and leased to the MPGA, who refurbished it. The square was opened to the public by the Earl of Meath in 1888. Having become derelict by the 1980s, the landscaping has been recently redesigned.
- St Thomas's Recreation Ground, LB Hackney, 1888. The New Gravel–Pit Chapel was a Non-Conformist chapel; the burial ground was closed in the 1850s. The burial ground was laid out as a public garden by Fanny Wilkinson in 1888; the MPGA contributed part of the cost.
- Tower Gardens, LB Tower Hamlets, 1888. Part of the former moat to the Tower of London was laid out as public gardens in 1888 by Fanny Wilkinson on behalf of the MPGA. Wilkinson laid it out with grass, trees and shrub beds, with paths and seating.
- Myatt's Fields Park, LB Lambeth, 1889. Myatt's Fields was a market garden which was given by the estate owner, William Minet, to the MPGA, which part-funded its laying out, before presenting to the new London County Council. Fanny Wilkinson designed the park with gravelled serpentine paths and planted with trees, grass, shrubbery and flowerbeds. Wilkinson was assisted by Emmeline Sieveking, the daughter of Queen Victoria's physician, Sir Edward Sieveking. The park retains the original layout.
- St Alfege Park, Royal Borough of Greenwich, 1889. St Alfege's Church was built on the site of the saint's martyrdom in 1012. The two churchyards were closed to burials in 1853; in 1889 they were transferred to the Greenwich District Board of Works. The later of the two churchyards was laid out as a garden and recreation ground by Fanny Wilkinson, and opened in 1889. Wilkinson planted 500 trees.
- National Gallery, City of Westminster, 1891. The MPGA placed bay trees in boxes on the railed-in terraces during the summer months.
- Barnsbury Square, LB Islington, 1891. Barnsbury Square was once the site of a mediaeval moated farm belonging to Barnsbury Manor. The central garden was laid out as ornamental pleasure grounds for the private use of residents of the Bishop Estate, which was developed from 1834. The MPGA purchased the lease of the gardens in 1889, and laid them out and opened them to the public in 1891. The lease expired in 1909, after which there were disputes over the freehold, but attempts to purchase it for the public failed in 1911. The gardens were then levelled for use as tennis courts and otherwise abandoned. In 1933 the freehold was belatedly acquired by Islington Council, and the MPGA funded the restoration and replanting of the gardens, including a fountain.
- Brockwell Park, LB Lambeth, 1892. Brockwell Park is the former estate of the manor house Brockwell Hall. The last private owner of the estate, Joshua John Blades Blackburn, proposed to sell it for housing development. In order to avoid that outcome and to preserve the land as public open space, part of the estate was purchased by the London County Council with the support of the MPGA, and was opened in 1892. The LCC acquired further parcels in 1895 and 1901.
- Christ Church, Spitalfields, LB Tower Hamlets, 1892. Christ Church, Spitalfields was built from 1714 to 1729, to a design by Nicholas Hawksmoor. The churchyard was closed to burials in 1856. It was converted to a public garden by the MPGA in 1892, laid out to a design by Wilkinson. However, it was largely built over by the church school, and only a small portion of the garden remains.
- St Anne's Churchyard, City of Westminster, 1892. The churchyard of St Anne's, Soho, rises 6 ft above the pavement, because of the 13,000 burials within it. It was closed to burials in 1853. Fanny Wilkinson laid it out as a garden in 1891, and it was opened to the public by Lady Hobhouse in 1892. The London plane trees remain a notable feature of the garden.
- St Botolph without Aldgate Churchyard, City of London, 1892. St Botolph's church is of Saxon origin, rebuilt in 1741-44 to a design by George Dance the Elder, and later restored by John Francis Bentley. The earliest record of the churchyard is in 1230. The churchyard was being used as a public open space by 1875. Fanny Wilkinson laid it out as a public garden in 1892. A drinking fountain, still extant, was installed in 1906 to the memory of the philanthropist Frederic David Mocatta.
- All Saints Churchyard, Poplar, LB Tower Hamlets, 1893. All Saints Church was built 1821-23 to a design by a little-known architect, Charles Hollis, with a tower modelled on Wren and George Gibbs|Gibbs. The churchyard on the north side of the church was re-ordered as a public garden by the MPGA 1893, and laid out by Wilkinson. Wilkinson's successor, Madeline Agar, laid out the rest of the churchyard in 1905, and it was opened in 1906.
- Duncan Terrace and Colebrooke Row Gardens, LB Islington, 1893. Duncan Terrace Gardens are a series of linear gardens, the southernmost of which was acquired by Islington Council in 1892. Designed by Wilkinson for the MPGA, the layout included weeping willows over a winding path, evocative of the (by then enclosed) New River.
- Goldsmith Square Recreation Ground, LB Hackney, 1893. Goldsmith Square was acquired by London County Council for housing, designed by CC Winmill. The open space in the middle of the square was laid out by Fanny Wilkinson as a garden in 1893. She incorporated gymnastic equipment for local children. Many of the original trees survive.
- Meath Gardens, LB Tower Hamlets, 1894. The privately owned Victoria Park Cemetery was established in 1842. Having fallen into disuse, it closed to burials in 1876. By 1885 it was in a very poor state and the MPGA approached the owner to lay it out as a public garden. After protracted negotiations, the MPGA raised funds for the London County Council to acquire it in 1893. It was one of the largest burial grounds that Fanny Wilkinson converted into a public garden. She was assisted by 30 unemployed men, the work taking a year as the ground proved hard to dig. The garden was opened by the Duke of York in 1894, and later renamed after the Earl of Meath, the Chairman of the MPGA at the time.
- Canning Town Recreation Ground, LB Newham, 1894. Beckton Park, since re-named, was opened by West Ham Council in 1894. Designed by Fanny Wilkinson on behalf of the MPGA, the park consisted of three distinct areas. The north-west area was laid out formally, with a bandstand, drinking fountain, tree-lined walks and shrubberies. The north-east area was a gymnasium and open-air swimming pool. The south-east area was laid out for open sports. The pool was replaced by a lido, which in turn has since been lost. The bandstand has also been lost.
- Bartholomew Square, LB Islington, 1894. Bartholomew Square is located on land formerly belonging to St Bartholomew's Hospital; it replaced a square known as Old Street Square which was laid out in 1815. The MPGA laid out an asphalted playground in 1894. The square has since been renamed Bartholomew Square.
- Bow Churchyard, LB Tower Hamlets, 1894. Bromley-by-Bow parish church originated in the 14th century as a chapel of ease of St Dunstan's, Stepney. The last burial in the churchyard was in 1854, and it was re-ordered as a public garden by the MPGA in 1894, laid out by Fanny Wilkinson, who took advice from CR Ashbee of the Society for the Protection of Ancient Buildings as to which tombstones should be preserved. The eastern section of the churchyard was laid out as a garden by Wilkinson’s successor Madeline Agar in 1911. More recent input by the MPGA has been the provision of 1,500 spring bulbs.
- Plaistow Park, LB Newham, 1894. Part of the grounds of Essex House, demolished in 1836, were acquired by West Ham Council for a public park in 1894. Fanny Wilkinson laid out the park with ornamental gardens on behalf of the MPGA. The park was opened by the Mayor of West Ham, Alderman Bethell (later Lord Bethell) in 1894 as the Balaam Street Recreation Ground. Apart from one avenue and the bandstand, the ornamental gardens remain intact. It was renamed in 1999.
- St John-at-Hackney churchyard, LB Hackney, 1894. The churchyard closed to burials in 1859, after which it became overgrown and derelict. It was laid out by Fanny Wilkinson, which included the demolition of Henry Rowe’s 1614 mortuary chapel, and opened for public recreation in 1894.
- Ion Square Gardens, LB Tower Hamlets, 1895. Ion Square was a set of terraced cottages, built in 1845, and a central communal garden. After an abortive attempt in 1886 by the Kyrle Society to open the garden to the public, the MPGA managed to obtain a 40-year lease in 1894. One of the tenant’s covenants was that the garden should be properly enclosed, laid out and maintained as a garden or shrubbery. It was opened in 1895. The garden has been through significant changes, but, in keeping with the 1894 lease, a separate shrubbery and garden have been retained.
- St Peter's Churchyard, Walworth, LB Southwark, 1895. St Peter's, Walworth, was the first church designed by the eminent architect Sir John Soane. The churchyard closed to burials in 1853. In 1895 the philanthropic Rector, Canon John Horsley (Mayor of Southwark in 1910), arranged for it to be converted to a public garden at the cost of the Goldsmiths' Company. The MPGA laid it out with grass and seats.
- St Matthew's Church Garden, LB Tower Hamlets, 1896. St Matthew's, Bethnal Green, was designed by George Dance the Elder and opened in 1746. The churchyard closed in the 1850s. Fanny Wilkinson, for the MPGA, converted it to a public garden in 1896. Wilkinson removed all but two of the tombs.
- Nursery Row Park, LB Southwark, 1897. The East Street Recreation Ground was established in 1897, with the MPGA funding the layout and planting; the perimeter London plane trees that were planted then still survive. In 1980 the park was extended and re-named after one of the streets that was then incorporated into it.
- Central Park, LB Newham, 1898. East Ham Urban District Council acquired the grounds of Rancliffe House in 1896 in order to create a park in the centre of East Ham. The MPGA provided a sundial, drinking fountains and seats.
- Addington Square, LB Southwark, 1898. Named after the former Prime Minister Henry Addington, the square was commenced in 1810, and completed as a private square in 1855. By 1897 the square had become derelict, but was renovated and opened for public use; the Association donated six seats in 1898. Although not commemorated with a plaque, Addington Square was the birthplace of Sir Robert Hunter, one of the founders of the National Trust and the solicitor to the Commons Preservation Society.
- Albion Square, LB Hackney, 1899. The square was laid out in 1844 to a design by an unknown architect. It was saved from dereliction in 1898 by grants from the MPGA and the London County Council. Fanny Wilkinson laid out the new garden on behalf of the MPGA. Funded by the philanthropist John Passmore Edwards, in 1910 the MPGA erected a drinking fountain in the centre of the square. It was restored in 2002.
- Hermit Road Recreation Ground, LB Newham, 1899. Hermit Road football ground was the home ground of Thames Ironworks F.C. (which later re-formed as West Ham) until 1896. After the club were evicted, West Ham Council acquired the land for a park with the assistance of funding, including from the MPGA, and was opened in 1899. The MPGA also provided 24 seats. The original features of the park have since disappeared.
- Christ Church Garden, LB Southwark, 1900. Christ Church was built in 1671. Its churchyard was closed to burials in 1856. In 1900 the MPGA laid out the churchyard as a public garden, and it was opened by the Bishop of Rochester that year (the parish then being in the Diocese of Rochester). Those works included a drinking fountain donated by John Passmore Edwards. The church was destroyed by bombing in 1941. The burning cross from the church fell into the churchyard, scorching the ground. The position in which it landed is marked with a stone cross, and is near to the drinking fountain which remains in place and is Grade II listed. The garden was renovated in 2000 with support from the MPGA, amongst others.
- St Mary's Churchyard, LB Newham, 1900. The churchyard of St Mary's, Plaistow, since rebuilt, was laid out by Fanny Wilkinson on behalf of the MPGA in 1900. The remaining gravestones are clustered in one corner.
- Petersham Common, LB Richmond, 1900. The MGPA assisted in formulating the Metropolitan Commons (Petersham) Supplemental Act 1900 which formed the basis of the preservation of Petersham Common.
- Archbishop's Park, LB Lambeth, 1901. Lambeth Palace has been the home of the Archbishop of Canterbury since the 13th century. In the late 19th century Archbishop Tait had nine acres of the palace gardens opened for the local poor, and was known as Lambeth Palace Field. In 1900 the MPGA led a campaign for the permanent and unrestricted opening of the field, which led to Archbishop's Park being opened in 1901. The MPGA provided funding for shrub planting.
- Museum of the Home, LB Hackney, 1901. The Geffrye Almshouses were built in 1712-14. The MPGA contributed to the funding for the acquisition of the former almshouses and garden by Shoreditch Metropolitan Council, and Fanny Wilkinson laid out the garden in 1900-01. However, the London County Council took over the site in 1910 to create the Geffrye Museum (now the Museum of the Home), and Wilkinson's design was replaced with a new layout. In 1992 a herb garden was opened on a formerly derelict site to the north of the building, partly funded again by the MPGA, which then awarded the herb garden its London Spade Award in 1992.
- Albert Gardens, LB Tower Hamlets, 1903. Albert Square was laid out in the 1840s, threatened with development in 1899, and rescued by the London County Council in 1900. Opened to the public as Albert Square Garden in 1902, the square features a drinking fountain provided by the Association in 1903, called Shepherd Boy, inscribed 'DFF' on the base. Albert Square Garden was renamed Albert Gardens in 1937. In 2013 it was proposed to restore the disused drinking fountain, which is Grade II listed.
- St Ann Blackfriars Burial Grounds, City of London, 1907. The site of two burial grounds, closed in 1849, was converted into public gardens by Madeline Agar in 1907. The gardens are notable for being mostly paved, which was an unusual design for Agar.
- West Square Gardens, LB Southwark, 1909. West Square was first laid out in 1799, formally laid out by 1813, but in the late 19th century was threatened with development. The MPGA spent 10 years campaigning to preserve it as an open space, and in 1909 obtained it after the London County Council bought the freehold. Madeline Agar laid out the gardens and restored the 1813 cruciform layout.
- Southwark Cathedral Precinct, LB Southwark, 1910. The churchyard dates from the earliest of times, as the cathedral is likely to have had a Saxon predecessor. The churchyard was closed to burials in 1853 (an exception being made in 1856 for George Gwilt the younger, the architect who saved the then St Saviour's Church from demolition in the 1830s). In 1910, on behalf of the cathedral chapter, Madeline Agar renovated the south-west corner of the churchyard. That garden was restored in 2001.
- Ducketts Common, LB Haringey, 1912. Tottenham Urban District Council converted the common into a recreation ground in 1900. Those works included the planting of 140 trees; a further 30 trees were provided by the MPGA in 1912. Many of the original trees survive.
- Emslie Horniman Pleasance Gardens, Royal Borough of Kensington and Chelsea, 1914. Built on land presented by the philanthropist Emslie Horniman, the gardens opened in 1914. They were designed by Charles Voysey and Madeline Agar, with a formal Spanish-style walled garden and an area of grass, trees and shrubs. The gardens later became rundown, and were restored in 1996.
- Wimbledon Common War Memorial, LB Wandsworth, 1921. ‘Nature provides the best memorial’ is part of the inscription on the war memorial within the Richardson Evans Memorial Playing Fields, designed by Madeline Agar in 1921, assisted by Brenda Colvin. The war memorial is Grade II listed.
- Mitcham Cricket Green, LB Merton, 1938. Cricket has been played on Mitcham Green since 1685, and it is reputedly the oldest cricket ground in use. The MPGA worked to prevent the cricket green from being lost to a highways scheme in 1938.
- Cleary Garden, City of London, 1982. Originally laid out on a WWII bomb site in the late 1940s, it was re-landscaped to commemorate the centenary of the MPGA in 1982, and renamed for Frederick Cleary, the then Chairman.

=== Current projects ===
- The MPGA contributes towards the administration of London in Bloom, which was initiated by the London Tourist Board in 1967.
- The MGPA works with Trees for Cities, which was established as Trees for London in 1993.
- The MPGA supports the London Open Garden Squares Weekend, which is organised by the London Historic Parks Gardens Trust and which enables the public to visit gardens that are not otherwise open.
- Together with Taylors Bulbs of Holbeach, the MPGA run 'Bulbs for London', which sends out bulbs to gardens across London.
- The MPGA makes grants to community gardens across London.

== London Spade ==
Since 1967, the MPGA has awarded the 'London Spade' each year to individuals and institutions that have made significant contributions to London’s green open spaces.

- 1970: Church of St John the Evangelist, East Dulwich SE15 for the excellent standard of the Church Garden
- 1971: The Church Commissioners for their Hyde Park Estate gardens
- 1972: H A Guirer (Superintendent of London Borough of Newham Parks Department) for his initiative in securing a major derelict site in E15 for public park
- 1973: Worshipful Company of Gardeners for Church Gardens Comp and floral award scheme in the City
- 1974: David Cook for his work at the Greater London Council Parks Department
- 1975: John Mowlem & Co Ltd for restoring the setting of St Paul's Cathedral
- 1976: J R Hare for his work as Bailiff of The Royal Parks
- 1977: The London Borough of Newham for the Densham Road Open Space
- 1978: Jack Kennedy for his work as Chief Officer of the Greater London Council parks Dept
- 1983: Greycoat City Offices and Standard Life Assurance for the construction of Cutlers Gardens
- 1984: Royal Parks for their restoration work at St James's Park
- 1986: New River Company for their gardens at the Angel, Islington
- 1987: Siddeley Landscapes for restoration/redesign of burial ground at Wesley's Chapel
- 1988: Project led by Mrs Runcie for the revival of Lambeth Palace garden and grounds
- 1989: E M Upward for his work as MPGA Secretary, 1965-87
- 1990: London Borough of Croydon for creation of South Norwood Country Park from derelict sewage farm
- 1991: London Borough of Tower Hamlets for creation of Ravenscroft Park, Bethnal Green
- 1992: London Borough of Lambeth for restoration of Rush Common
- 1993: Herb Garden at the Geffrye Museum
- 1994: Jenny Crossland for safeguarding the future of London in Bloom
- 1995: London Borough of Croydon for creation of Croydon Crematorium water garden
- 1996: London Borough of Hackney with Albion Square Residents Association for the restoration of Albion Square garden
- 1997: The Peabody Trust for the courtyard garden at The Gateway rehabilitation centre
- 1998: J Buttress for outstanding services to the beautification of London
- 1999: London Borough of Barking and Dagenham for creating Eastbrookend Country Park and the Millennium Centre
- 2000: Christ Church Garden, Southwark
- 2001: Transport for London Street Management
- 2002: David Jones OBE
- 2003: King's College London Maughan Library Garden
- 2004: London Borough of Hillingdon
- 2005: London Borough of Lambeth and the Streatham Society
- 2006: London Borough of Lewisham and the Telegraph Hill Association
- 2007: The Honourable Societies of the Inner and Middle Temple
- 2008: The University of London
- 2009: Roger Payton
- 2010: Kenwyn Pearson
- 2011: Roots & Shoots
- 2012: Joyce Bellamy, MBE
- 2013: Rookery Centenary Committee
- 2014: Anne Holman of London in Bloom
- 2015: Bankside Open Spaces Trust
- 2016: Flowers in the City
- 2017: Taylors Bulbs of Holbeach
- 2018: Garden Museum
- 2019: Paul Rochford of Joseph Rochford Gardens
- 2020: Deptford Folk and Tony Leach
- 2021: David Shreeve, Executive Director of the Conservation Foundation

== Landscape gardeners ==
- John Forsyth Johnson, 1882–84. Johnson was the son of the landscape architect Joseph Forsyth Johnson. He did not continue to practise as a landscape architect: in the 1891, 1901 and 1911 censuses his occupation is recorded as a warehouse porter. (His son John Thomas Forsyth Johnson was the father of the entertainer Bruce Forsyth.)
- Fanny Wilkinson, 1884–1905.
- Madeline Agar, 1905–(almost 25 years)

== Presidents ==
- Lord Birkett, 1986-2010
- Hugh Johnson, 2011-present

== Chairmen ==
- Lord Brabazon, (from 1887 the 12th Earl of Meath), 1882-(over 40 years; he died in 1929)
- Fred Cleary (in 1979 when he was made MBE), after whom Cleary Garden (built on the site of a Roman bathhouse) was named in 1982.
- Richard Saunders (in 1987)
- Roger Payton, 1991-2008
- William Fraser, -2019
- Rex Thornborough, 2019-(?)
- Nicholas Evans, 2024-present
