= East Kent Sudbury School =

Education community in Deal, Kent

Coordinates: 51.18637982359268°N 1.378258243207043°E

East Kent Sudbury
- Rippledown House, Ringwould, Deal, Kent; England

Information
- Type: Home education learning community
- Established: January 2019
- Founder: Kezia Cantwell-Wright
- Closed: 17 July 2025
- Website: eastkentsudburyschool.org.uk

East Kent Sudbury was a part-time, self-directed, fee-paying democratic setting for home-educated children aged 5–18 located in Deal, Kent in the United Kingdom. Students direct their own learning in an environment that promotes ideas of freedom and a right to determine their own futures. The community was democratically run with each member having one vote exercised at a weekly meeting. The community operated on Sudbury school principles, and opened in January 2019, but has attracted controversy.

Initially called East Kent Sudbury School, it is now just styled as East Kent Sudbury, describing itself as "a part-time learning community".

== History ==
The opening of the school was gradual; in January 2019 initially renting a former nursery space in the Cliftonville Community Centre, Margate. It offered a sliding scale fee structure with an aim to be inclusive. In 2020 EKS moved to Buckland House, in Dover before its current location.

Since 2022, the school is situated at Rippledown House in Ringwould on a site developed for outdoor learning and donated by Fred Cleary. It was a residential centre for school children from Kent and London set in extensive grounds. It is now owned and maintained by The Bay Trust.

Its opening courted controversy in the local community, given the fee-paying nature it risked being seen as elitist, particularly given its initial opening in Cliftonville, a longstanding poorer community that had seen an influx of Londoners move there.

== Philosophy ==
Co-Founder, Kezia Cantwell-Wright, who is an alumnus of A.S Neill's Summerhill was already home educating her children and sought a school with similar principles. Finding none in the area or indeed the UK she, alongside Kate Coleman and others, founded the setting as the UK's first Sudbury model school.

The setting provides a forest school, art and music rooms, a library and places for woodwork and quiet study,

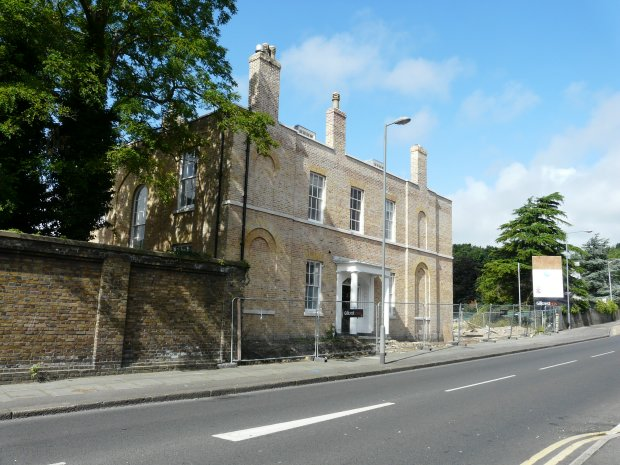
In 2020 EKS was based in Buckland House, Dover, Kent

== See also ==
- List of Sudbury schools
