= Madeline Agar =

British landscape gardener and author

Madeline Agnes Agar (21 May 1874 – 30 November 1967) was a British landscape designer. She was an early professional female landscape designer in Britain, and responsible for the design and the layout of a number of public gardens across London in the early 20th-century. She was the second woman to be the landscape gardener for the Metropolitan Public Gardens Association and was an author of books on gardening.

== Early life ==
Agar was born in Notting Hill in 1874, to Edward Larpent Agar, a solicitor, and his wife Agnes (née Henty). She was baptised on 26 July 1874 at All Saints, Nazeing, in Essex. The zoologist Wilfred Agar and the Chief Justice of British Honduras, 1936–40, Sir Arthur Kirwan Agar, were younger brothers.

Her grandfather was William Talbot Agar; that William Agar's father was the William Agar after whom Agar Town at St Pancras was named.

Agar attended the independent Wimbledon High School when the school was located at its original building on Wimbledon Hill. The Scottish MP the Duchess of Atholl was a contemporary.

== Career ==
Agar studied landscape design in the United States, and then two years of horticultural studies at Swanley Horticultural College, obtaining her certificate in 1895. Women had only been admitted to Swanley in 1891, and Agar was one of the earliest women to complete the course.

For a time Agar was a teacher, and in 1901 was an assistant mistress at Wycombe Abbey school during the time that Dame Frances Dove was headmistress. The future headmistress Annie Whitelaw was an assistant mistress at the same time.

Fanny Wilkinson resigned as the Metropolitan Public Gardens Association's landscape gardener in 1904 to become the first female Principal of Swanley Horticultural College, which had recently converted to teaching only women. The MPGA had been established in 1882 by Lord Brabazon (later the 12th Earl of Meath) to take advantage of the recently enacted Open Spaces legislation, which permitted the conversion of disused burial grounds into parks and gardens for public recreation. Agar was appointed in her place, and held the position for almost 25 years before retiring.

Her work for the MPGA included the following gardens:

- St Ann Blackfriars Burial Grounds, City of London, 1907. The site of two burial grounds, closed in 1849, was converted into public gardens by Agar in 1907. The gardens are notable for being mostly paved, which was an unusual design for her.
- West Square Gardens, LB Southwark, 1909. West Square was first laid out in 1799, formally laid out by 1813, but in the late 19th-century was threatened with development. The MPGA spent 10 years campaigning to preserve it as an open space, and in 1909 obtained it after the London County Council bought the freehold. Agar laid out the gardens and restored the 1813 cruciform layout.
- Southwark Cathedral Precinct, LB Southwark, 1910. The churchyard dates from the earliest of times, as the cathedral is likely to have had a Saxon predecessor. The churchyard was closed to burials in 1853 (an exception being made in 1856 for George Gwilt the younger, the architect who saved the then St Saviour's Church from demolition in the 1830s). In 1910, on behalf of the Cathedral Chapter, Agar renovated the south-west corner of the churchyard. That garden was restored in 2001.
- Emslie Horniman Pleasance Gardens, Royal Borough of Kensington and Chelsea, 1914. Built on land presented by the philanthropist Emslie Horniman, the gardens opened in 1914. They were designed by Agar and Charles Voysey, with a formal Spanish-style walled garden and an area of grass, trees and shrubs. The gardens later became rundown, and were restored in 1996.
- Wimbledon Common War Memorial, LB Wandsworth, 1921. 'Nature provides the best memorial' is part of the inscription on the war memorial within the Richardson Evans Memorial Playing Fields, designed by Agar in 1921, assisted by her pupil Brenda Colvin. The war memorial is Grade II listed.

Agar considered her most important work to be the private gardens at Place House, Fowey, in Cornwall. A rockery and rose garden from Agar's design are extant. Although the house itself is Grade I listed and the walls to the house are Grade II* listed, no part of the garden design is protected by listing.

Agar wrote three books on gardening.

- A Primer of School Gardening, (1909: G Philip & Son). The Primer had an introduction by Miss J.F. Dove (the educationalist Dame Frances Dove, who had been headmistress when Agar was a teacher at Wycombe Abbey school).
- Garden Design, in theory and practice, (1911: Sidgwick & Jackson). This was the first work on the subject by a woman.
- With Mary Stout, A Book of Gardening for the sub-tropics, with a calendar for Cairo, (1921: H. F. & G. Witherby).

Whilst still working for the MPGA, in 1918 Agar taught a new course in landscape gardening at Swanley Horticultural College. An early student was Brenda Colvin, who would later become the first female president of the Institute of Landscape Architects (now the Landscape Institute) in 1951. Agar's time at Swanley occurred during the troubled period between Fanny Wilkinson's first retirement in 1916 and her return in 1921, and Agar left, continuing to teach some of her students (including Colvin) privately.

== Personal life ==
Agar was unmarried. After a long retirement, she died in 1967, aged 93, in St George's Nursing Home, Milford-on-Sea, in Hampshire. She left an estate worth £48,274 (worth approximately £850,500 in 2017).
