= City & Metropolitan Building Society =

- Type: Building Society (Mutual)
- Industry: Financial services
- Founded: 1948
- Defunct: 1996
- Fate: Merged with Stroud & Swindon Building Society
- Products: Savings, Mortgages

City & Metropolitan Building Society was a UK building society, founded by Frederick Cleary CBE in 1948, which merged with the Stroud & Swindon Building Society in 1996.
