= Arbour Square Police Station =

Police station in London, England, 1840s–1999

Coordinates: 51°30′56″N 000°02′52″W

Arbour Square police station was located in Stepney, London. Built in the 1840s by the Metropolitan Police, it became known for holding IRA members and the Kray Twins. It was closed down in 1999 and squatted twice before being redeveloped into apartments.

== History ==
The site on the corner of Aylward Street and East Arbour Street near Arbour Square in Stepney was rented by the Metropolitan Police from the Worshipful Company of Mercers in 1841. A three storey redbrick police station was built, with a court beside it which became Thames Magistrates Court. The land was bought in 1888 for £7,500. The station was upgraded in the 1920s and then sustained wartime damage in 1944 from a V-1 flying bomb. It became the divisional headquarters of H division in 1947, taking over from Leman Street.

When the Social Democratic Federation held a rally in 1885, eight people were arrested and taken to Arbour Square. At the court case the next day, William Morris was arrested and charged with assaulting the police. In the 20th-century, the station became known for holding IRA members and the Kray Twins in its custody block. The building was deemed surplus to requirements in 1999, and was left derelict before being squatted in 2004. After the squatters were evicted in 2005, it remained empty until 2011 when it was again squatted. The station has now been redeveloped into residential apartments.
