= Vauxhall Park =

Park in the Vauxhall area of the London Borough of Lambeth

Coordinates: 51.4830°N 0.1220°W

Vauxhall Park Act 1888
- Act of Parliament
- Parliament of the United Kingdom
- Long title: An Act to authorise the acquisition of the Lawn and Carroun House, Lambeth, and its utilization for public purposes.
- Citation: 51 & 52 Vict. c. clxxviii

Dates
- Royal assent: 7 August 1888
Other legislation
Repealed by	Local Law (Greater London Council and Inner London Boroughs) Order 1965

Status: Repealed

Text of statute as originally enacted

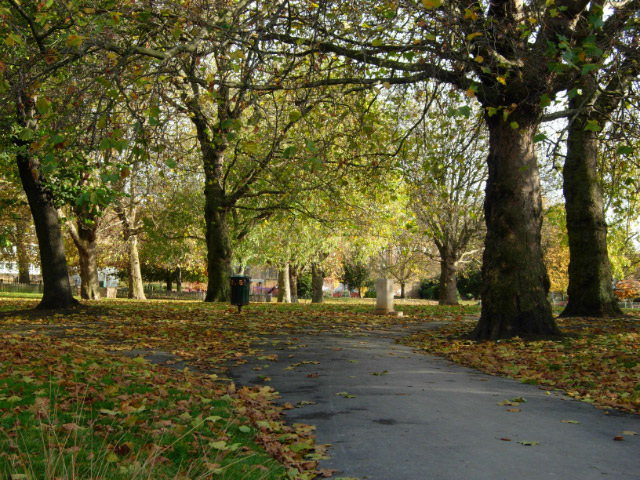
Vauxhall Park in November 2008

Vauxhall Park is a Green Flag Award-winning municipal park in Vauxhall, South London, run by Lambeth Council. It occupies an 8.5-acre (3.4 ha) site, and was created at a cost of around £45,000, following a public campaign led by the suffragist Millicent Fawcett, the social reformer Octavia Hill and members of the Kyrle Society. The land was purchased from a local developer under the Vauxhall Park Act 1888 (51 & 52 Vict. c. clxxviii) and the houses of Lawn Terrace demolished accordingly. The new park was formally opened in 1890 by the Prince of Wales.

== History ==
It was the wish of the blind MP Henry Fawcett that the park be created, and his former garden is one part of the park. The design of the park was the work of Fanny Wilkinson, the first professional female landscape designer in Britain. A statue of Fawcett by the artist George Tinworth was erected in the park in 1903, but was removed by Lambeth Council in 1959 and has since been replaced by a plaque. Octavia Hill, a staunch believer that all people ought to have access to nature and open spaces, and the Commons Preservation Society successfully campaigned against development in the park in the late 19th century.

== Features ==
One of Edgar Wilson's model villages is located in the park (others are located in Brockwell Park and Fitzroy Gardens in Melbourne). The model village was restored and re-opened by the then MP Kate Hoey in 2001. The park is famous for its lavender garden, located on the former bowling green, and annual lavender harvest. Lambeth Council undertook a major renovation of the park in 2020.

== Facilities ==
The facilities in the park include a children's playground, a One O’Clock Club, a nursery, a multi-use games area, two tennis courts, chess tables, a park café, and two fenced dog areas. There is an active Friends of Vauxhall Park, established in 1999.
