= East Street Market =

Market in Walworth, South London

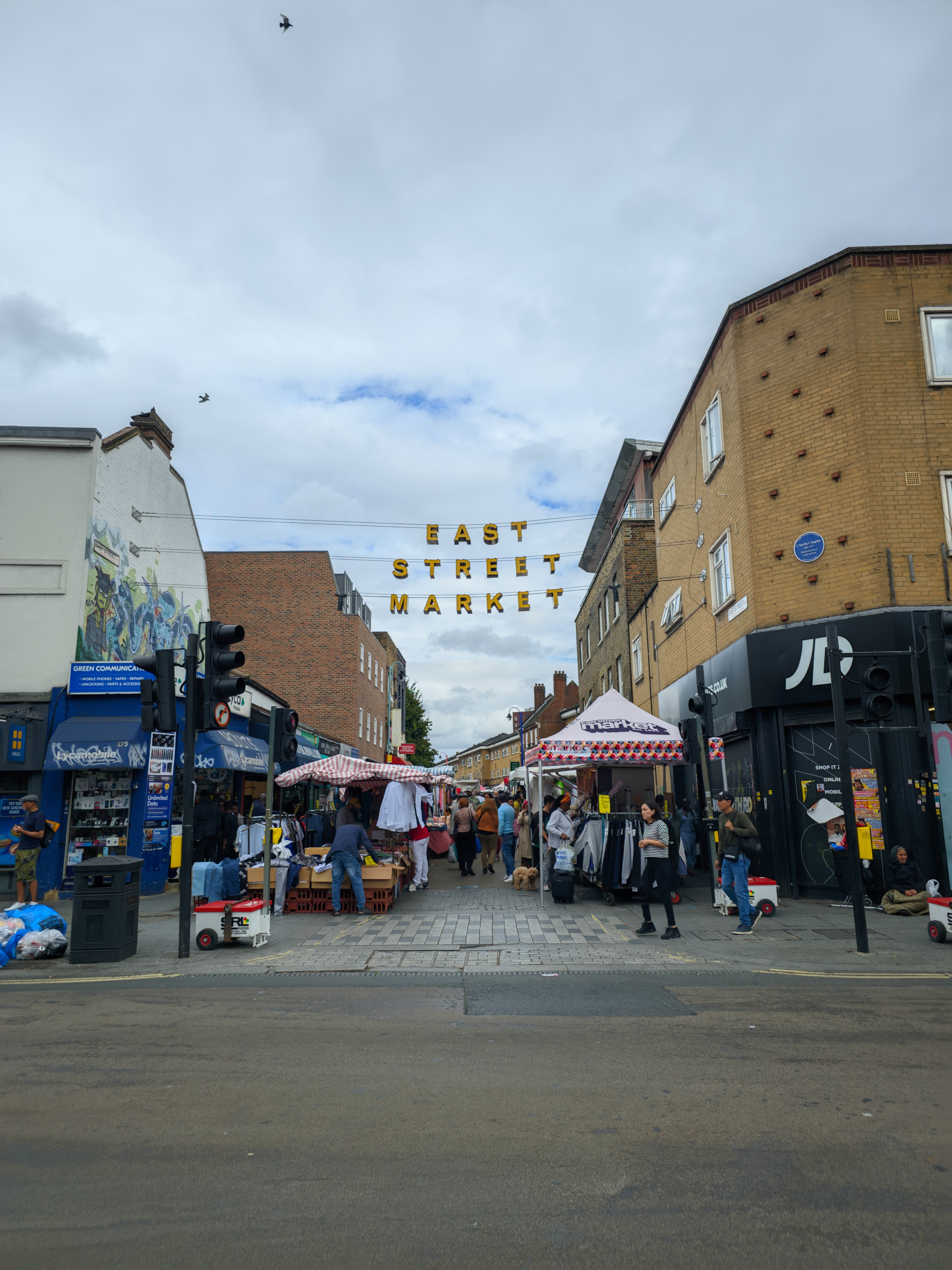
- Entrance to the market
- Location: East Street; Walworth, Southwark, Greater London; 51°29′22″N 0°05′20″W
- Management: Southwark London Borough Council
- Owner: Southwark London Borough Council
- Environment: Outdoor
- Goods sold: General goods
- Days normally open: Tuesday–Sunday
- Number of tenants: 252
- Interactive map of East Street Market

East Street Market also known locally as 'East Street', 'The Lane', or 'East Lane', is a street market in Walworth in South East London.

== Location ==
East Street is in the London Borough of Southwark, between Walworth Road on the western side and the Old Kent Road on the Eastern side.

The market runs down East Street from the junction with Walworth Road to Dawes Street, passing East Street Baptist Church and a many shops. The main entrance to the market is from Walworth Road. A bus stop on Walworth road serves the market, with buses arriving from Elephant and Castle or Camberwell Green. These include bus numbers 12, 35, 40, 45, 68, 148, 171, 176 and 468.

== History ==
There has been street trading in the Walworth area since the 16th Century, when farmers rested their livestock on Walworth Common before continuing to the city. During the Industrial Revolution, stalls lined the whole of the Walworth Road, but the market has only been officially running since 1880.

In the 17th century, the area through which East Street now runs was rural fields and ‘common’ land where people could graze their animals. The area to the north was known as ‘Lock's Field’ and, in 1878, was described as little more than ‘a dreary swamp’. Conditions improved and by 1881 it was recorded as a site for gypsies to stay during the winter months. To the south was Walworth Common; a popular point for the farmers of Kent and Surrey to stop overnight before making their journey into the city. People would buy produce directly from these drovers and eventually a market was established.

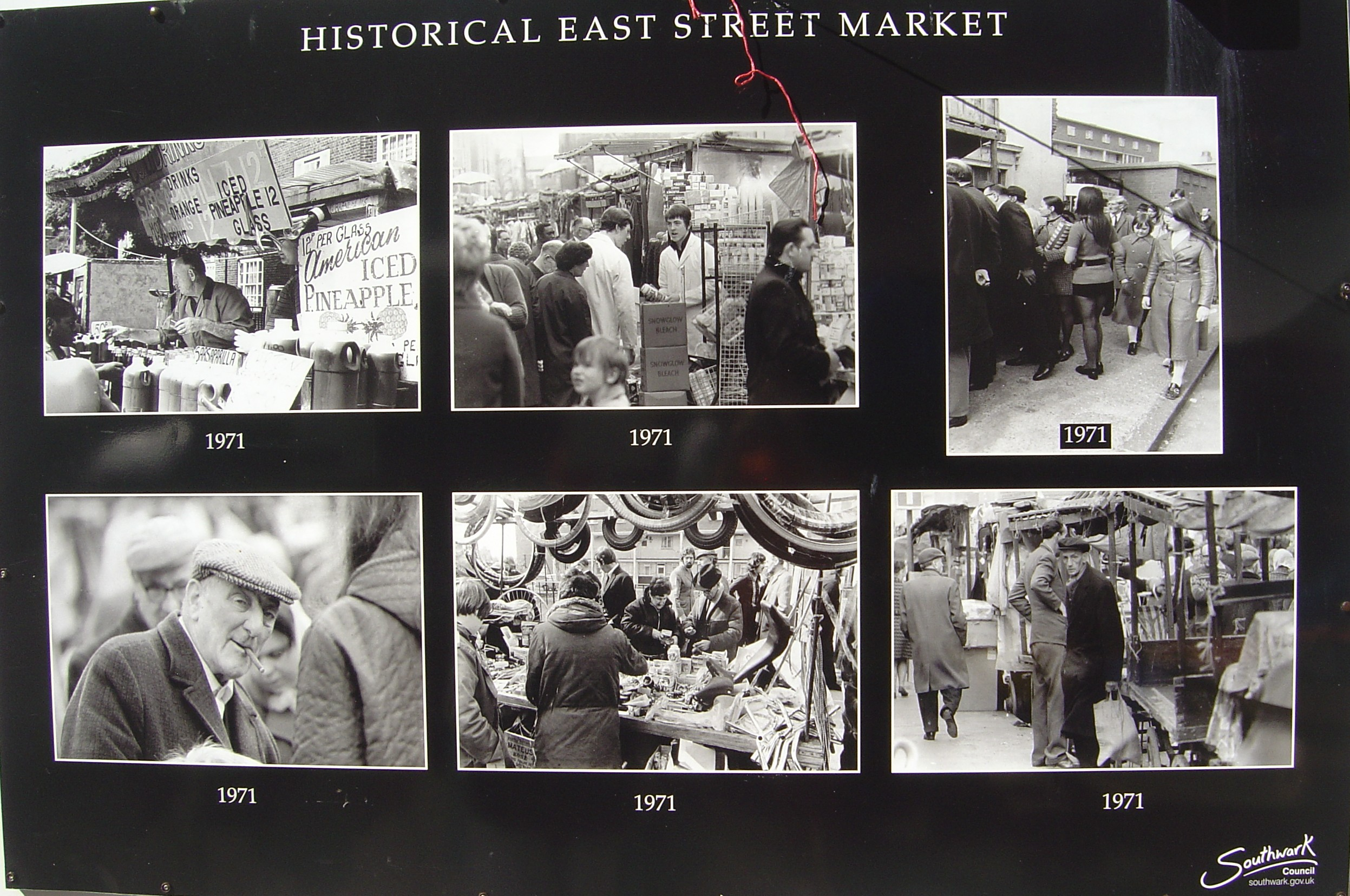
East Street market history

Most of the land in the area was owned by the Church, but some was eventually sold or leased. By the 1770s, some land near the junction with Old Kent Road (known then simply as The Kent Road) was cultivated as a flower nursery by the Driver family, who were also responsible for commissioning the grand buildings at nearby Surrey Square. A legal document from 1780 describes the sale of the land which led to the creation of East Street as a public highway, connecting Walworth Road with the Kent Road. By the 1800s London was expanding rapidly. Open fields were built upon and in the 1860s, Walworth Common was developed. The old markets were moved onto the Walworth Road and the vegetable sellers (Costermongers) were joined by an array of other traders. In 1875, the electric tram ran down Walworth Road bringing to an end the market. After negotiations with the traders, the market was split up and moved into the side streets of Westmoreland Road, East Lane and Draper Street. Draper Street was built over in the 1960s by the Elephant and Castle development. The construction of the Aylesbury Estate led to the decline of the Westmoreland Road market.

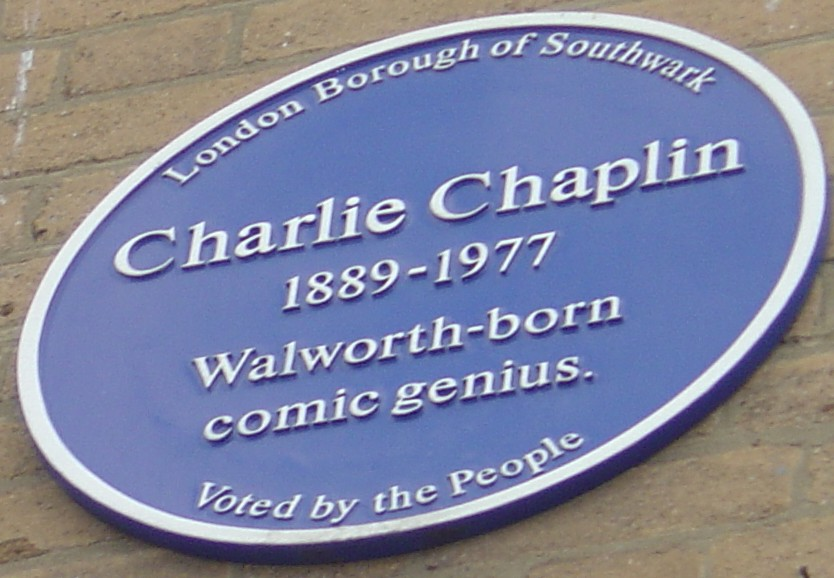
Charlie Chaplin blue plaque at the entrance to East Street market

Unlike today's regulated market, the original traders did not have allocated plots for their stalls. At 8am, a policeman blew a whistle and traders would rush to claim the best pitches, with shop owners on the Lane claiming the patches outside their front doors. This ended in 1927 when the licensing system was introduced. Many local men were called up in the Second World War and the market declined. In 1948 it was described as "a drab, dead thing, infinitely remote from the cockney tradition". However, the market survived and evolved. As the population of the area has diversified so have the goods on offer and, along with the traditional fruit and vegetables, the market now sells a mix of Caribbean food, ethnic clothing, CDs and household goods.

Recently, the Walworth Society has run East Street tours to share the history of the market.

East Street was the likely birthplace of Charlie Chaplin, although no birth certificate exists. It could have been the inspiration for his similarly named 1917 seminal short film Easy Street, a suggestion made as early as 1928 in the film The Life Story of Charlie Chaplin by Harry B. Parkinson and reasserted in David Robinson's introduction to the most recent edition of My Autobiography, while the famous trousers and boots of Chaplin's trademark tramp costume may have been inspired by the every-day clothes Chaplin saw worn in what he called East Lane market.

It also features in the title sequence to the television programme Only Fools and Horses.

== Produce ==
The market sells new and second-hand clothing, jewellery, cosmetics, household products, confectionery, fruit and vegetables, CDs and DVDs, shoes, bags and hats, books, cards, meat and fish. The food ranges from cassava to courgettes, durian fruit to eel, and sheep heads to cow hooves.

== Opening times ==
The market is open every day except Monday: Tuesday to Friday 8am–5pm, Saturday 8am–6:30pm, Sunday 8am–2pm (though often is open until late afternoon). Saturday is the busiest day as the market consists of over 250 stalls including the weekly plant market. A small flea market operates on Sundays near Nursery Row Park towards the Old Kent Road side of East Street.

== Politics ==
Since the 2024 general election, East street has been within Peckham parliamentary constituency represented by Miatta Fahnbulleh.

East Street forms the boundary line between the wards of East Walworth on the north side and Faraday on the south side, both in the London Borough of Southwark. East Street is therefore represented in Southwark Council by six councillors, all Labour. The East Walworth councillors are Helen Morrissey, Martin Seaton and Darren Merrill. Faraday ward is represented by Dan Garfield, Lorraine Lauder and Abdul Mohammed.

East Street is under the jurisdiction of Walworth Community Council.

== East Street market today ==
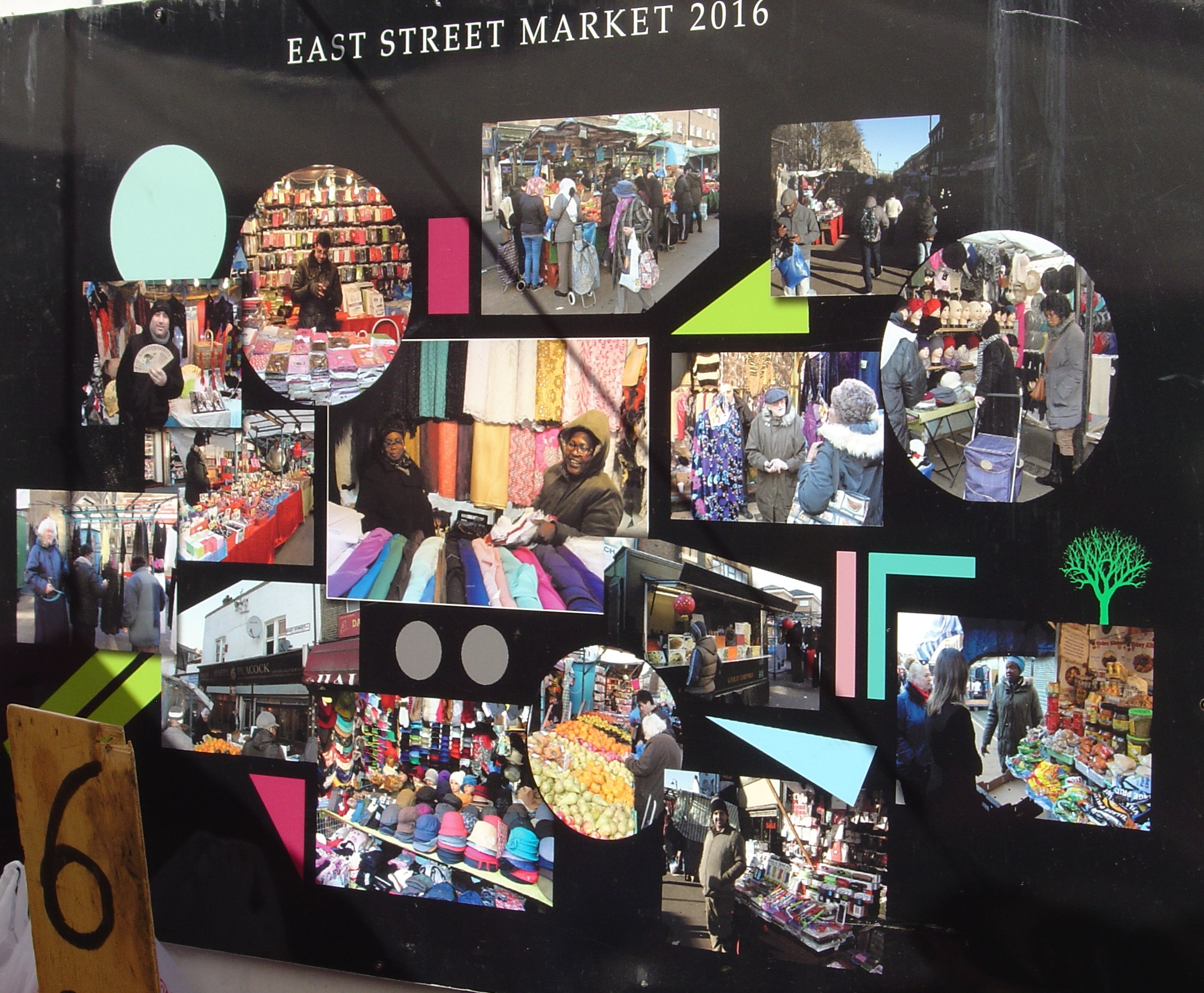
East Street market 2016

Southwark has an ethnically diverse and youthful population – and the East Street market venders and shoppers reflect this diversity. Southwark has the highest proportion of residents in the UK who were born in Africa (13%), as well as a significant population from Latin America, with 75% of reception-age (4–5 years old) children from black and minority ethnic groups. Over 120 languages are spoken in Southwark, with 11% of households having no member of the household who has English as a first language.

Some vendors have expressed concern about the implications of the redevelopment of the surrounding area for the market. In 2015, it was the subject of several immigration raids.

== Gallery ==
East Street market

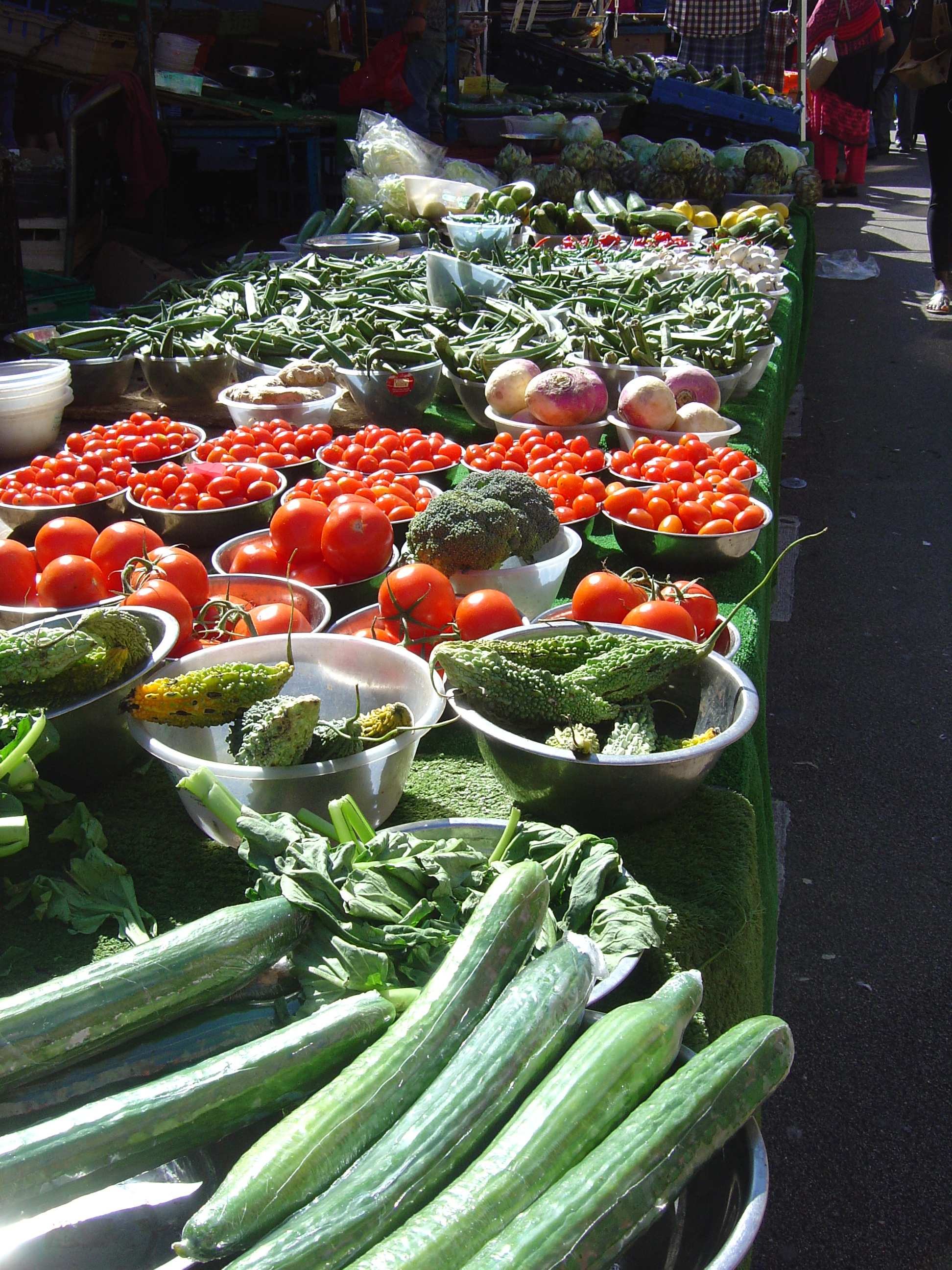

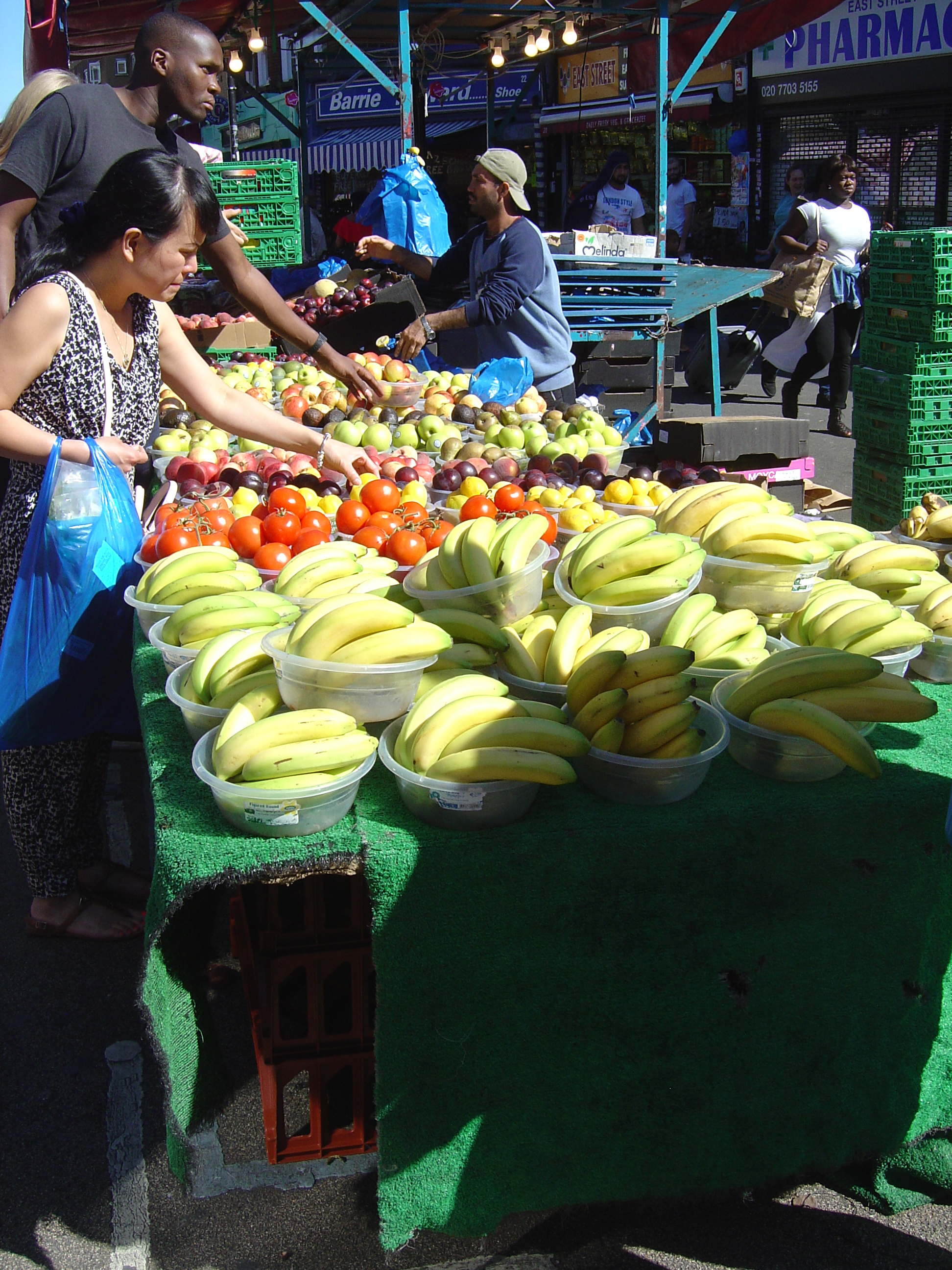

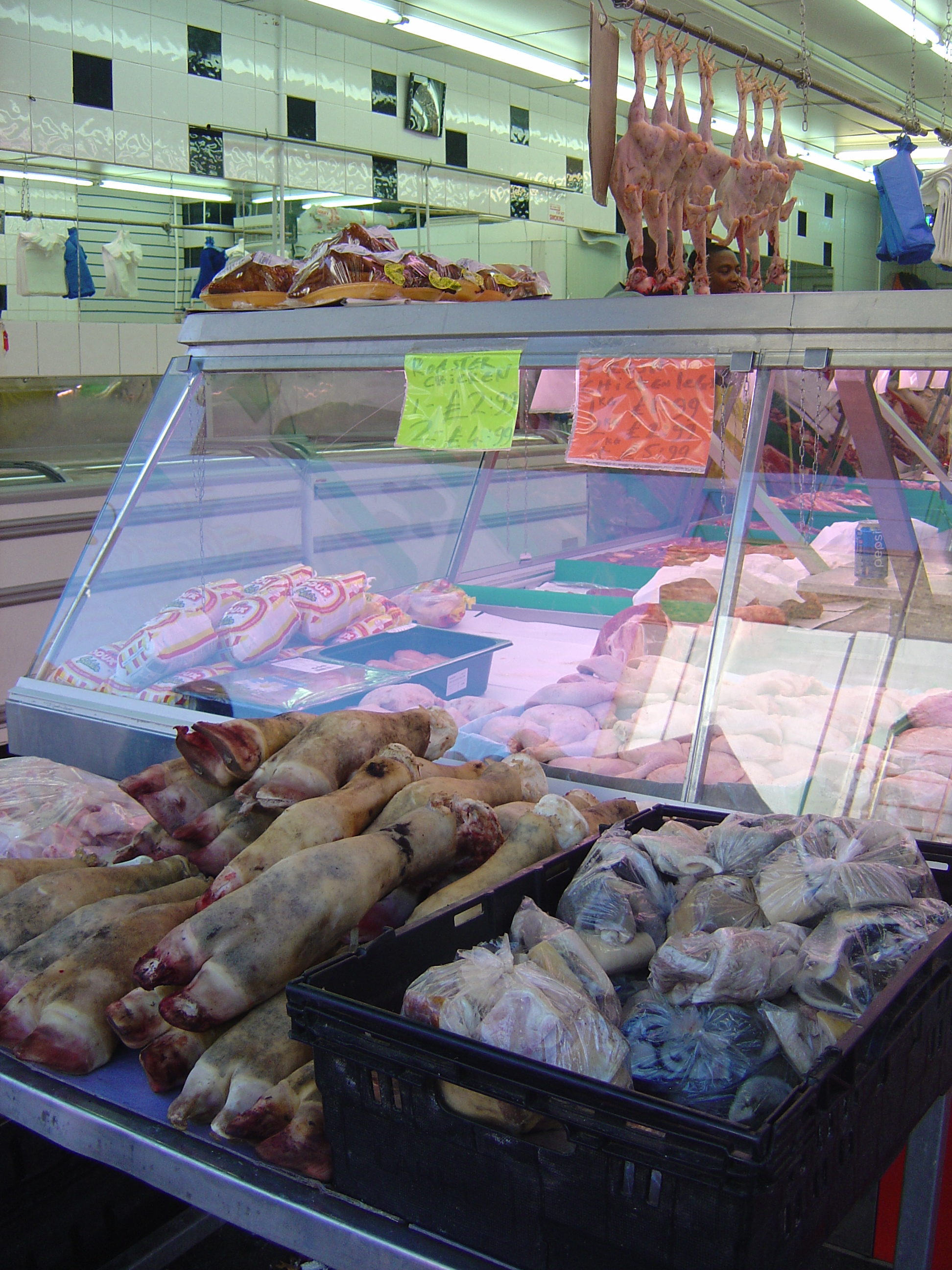

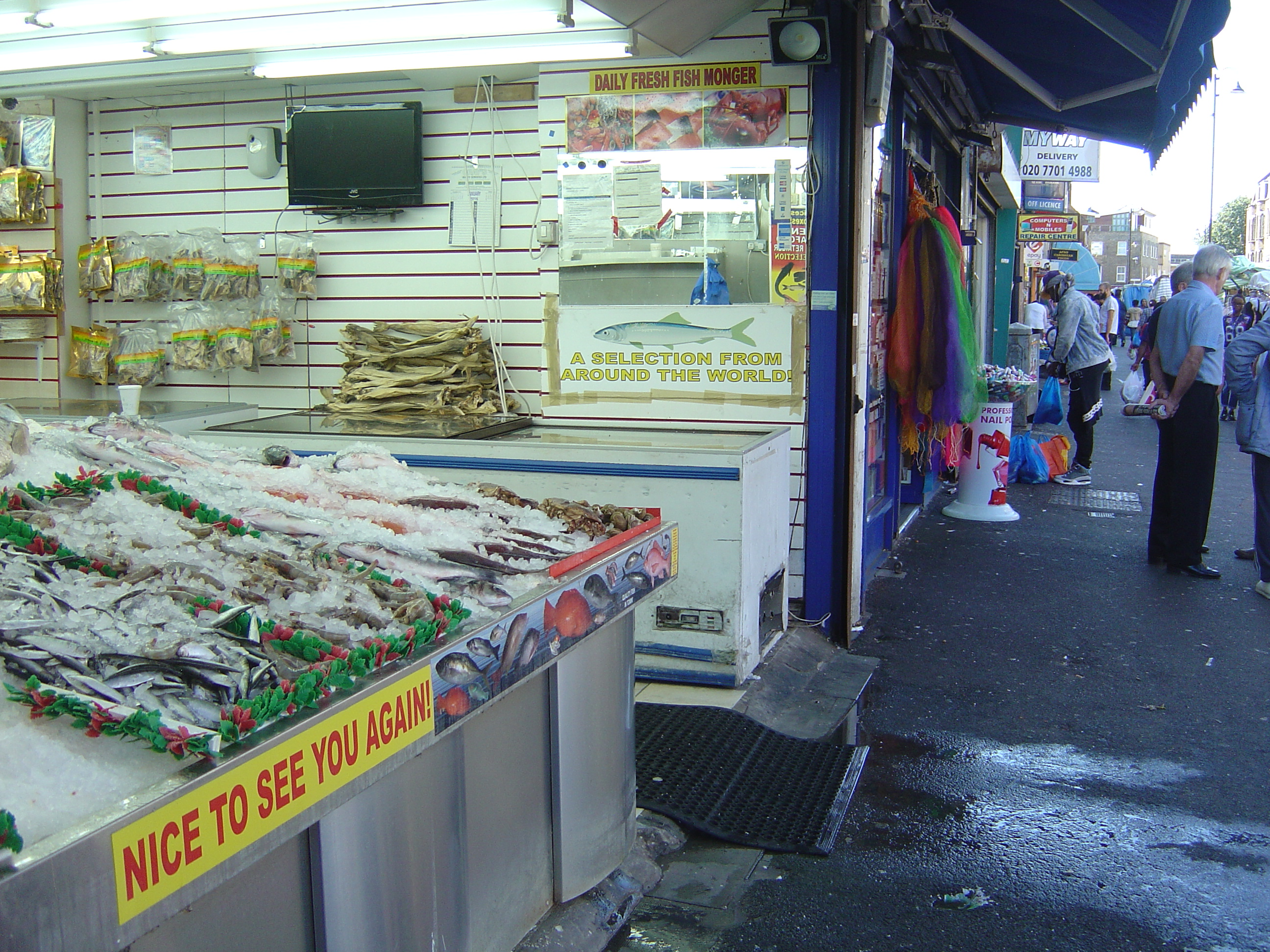

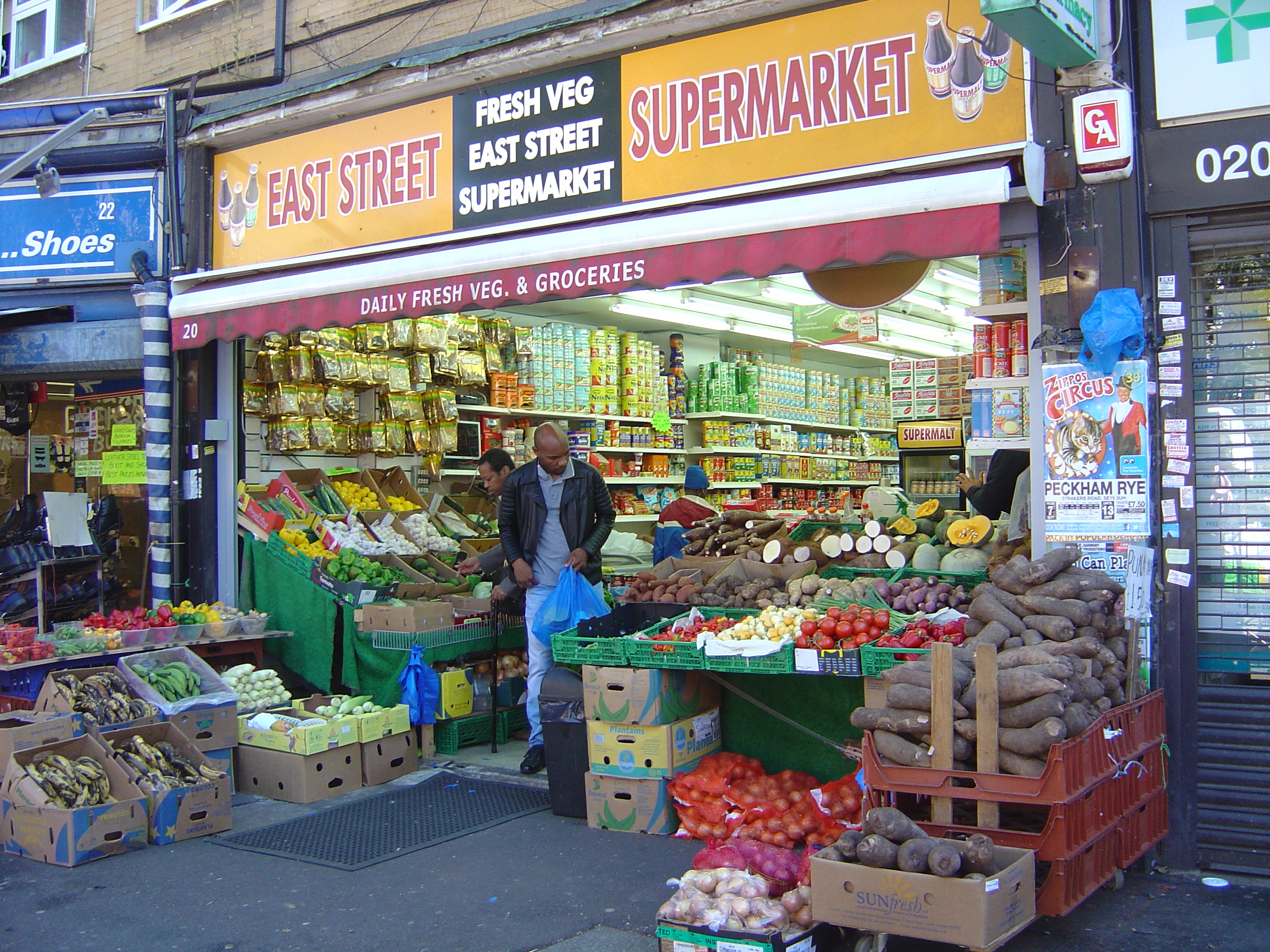

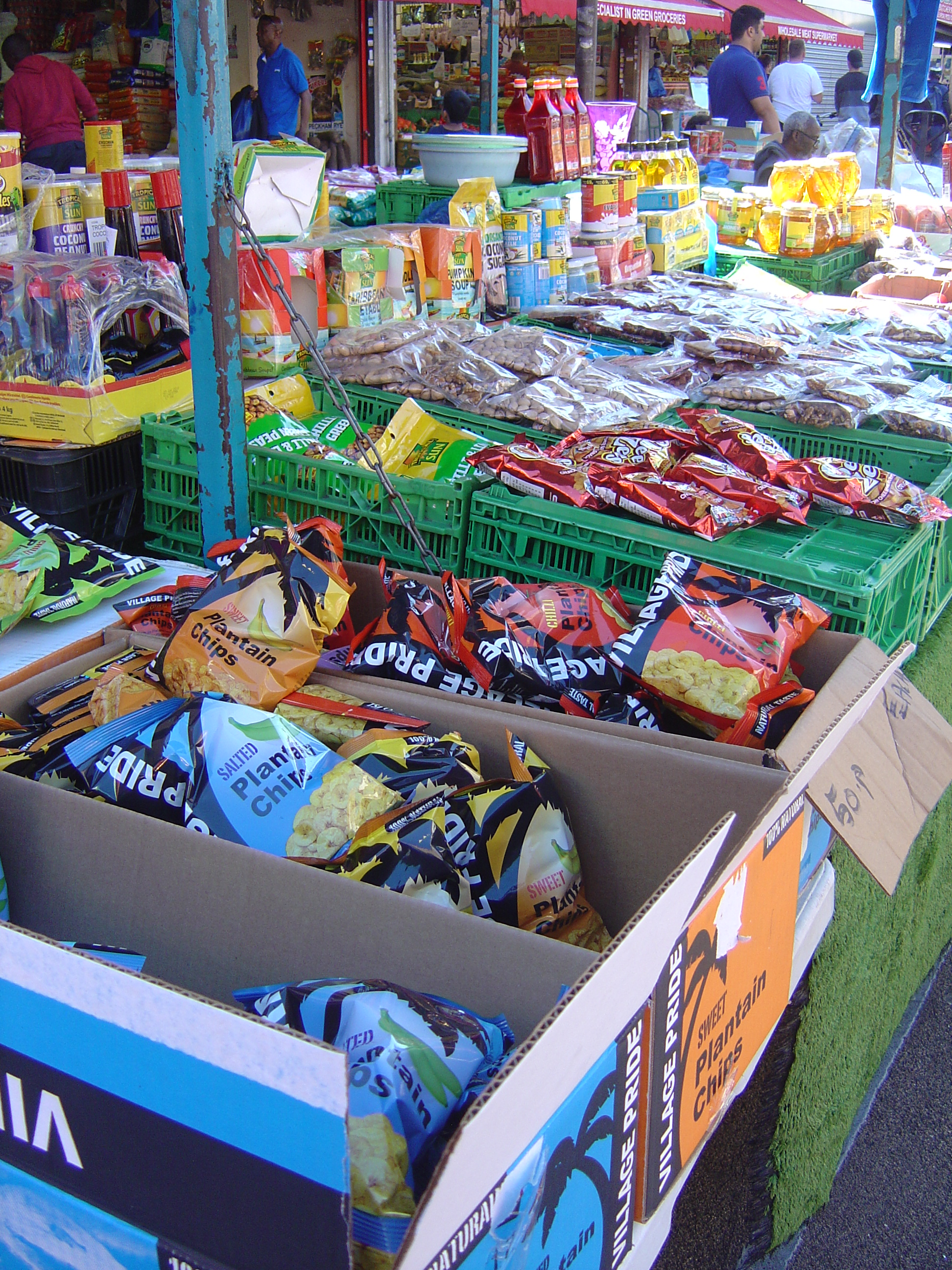

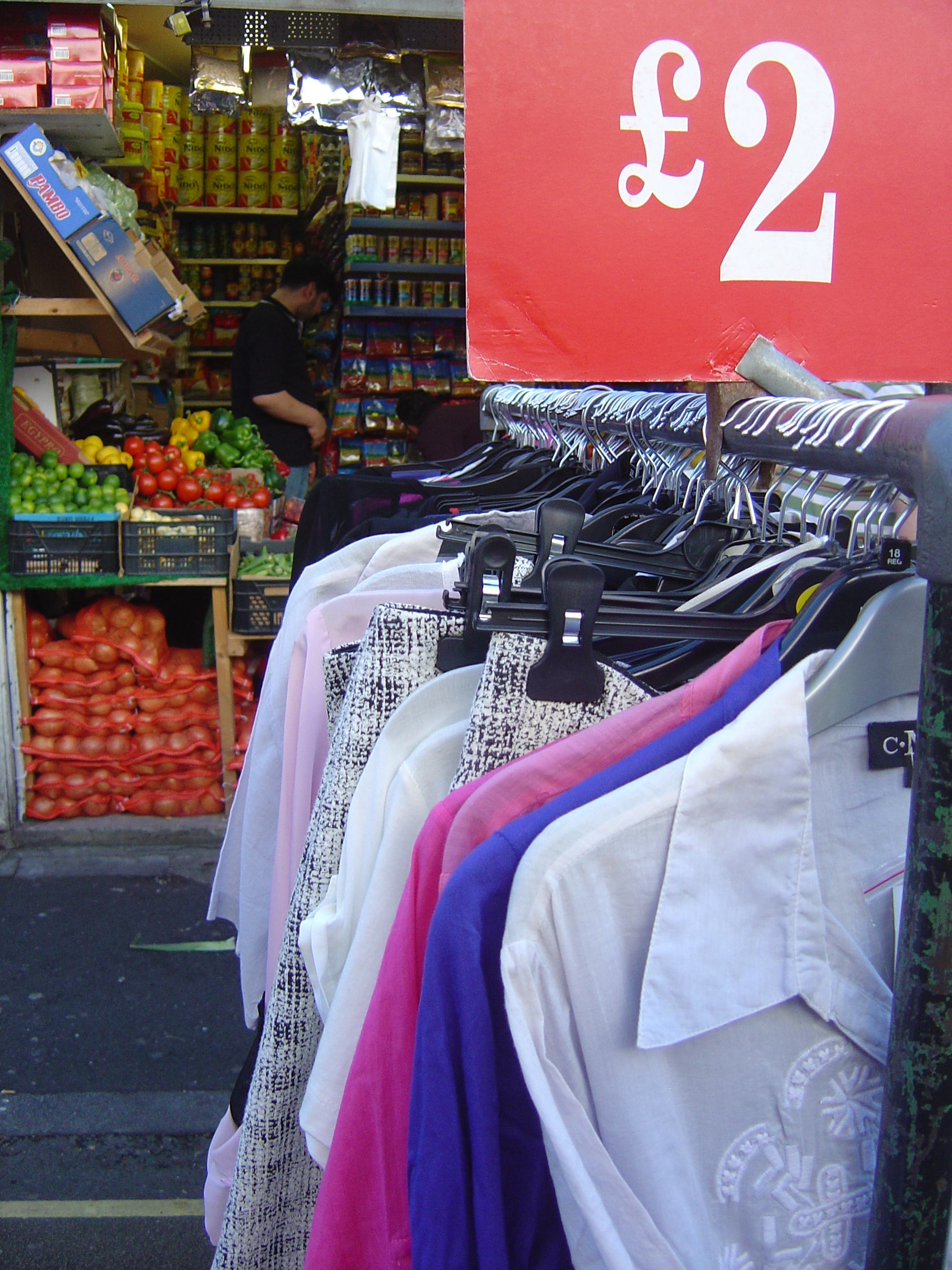

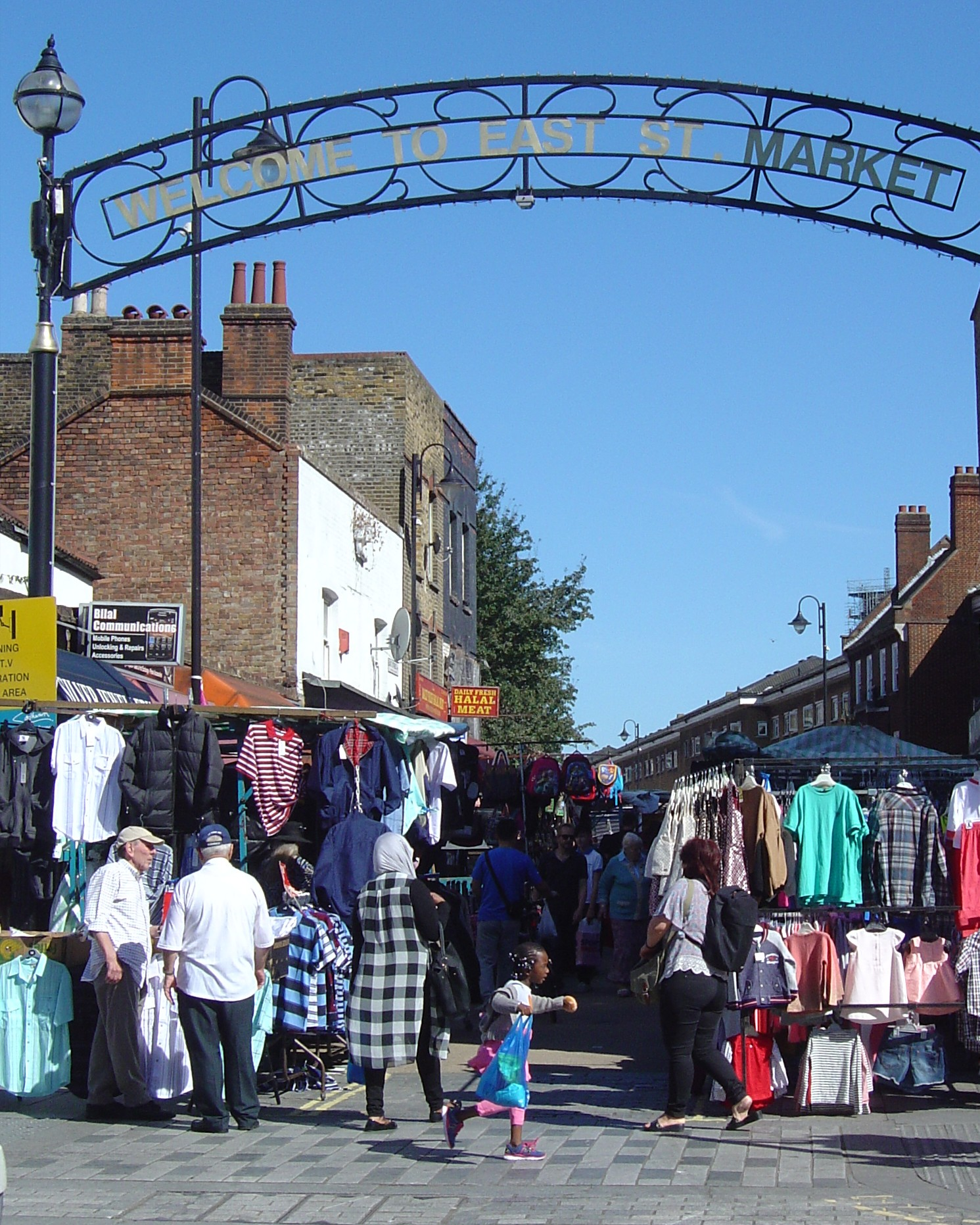

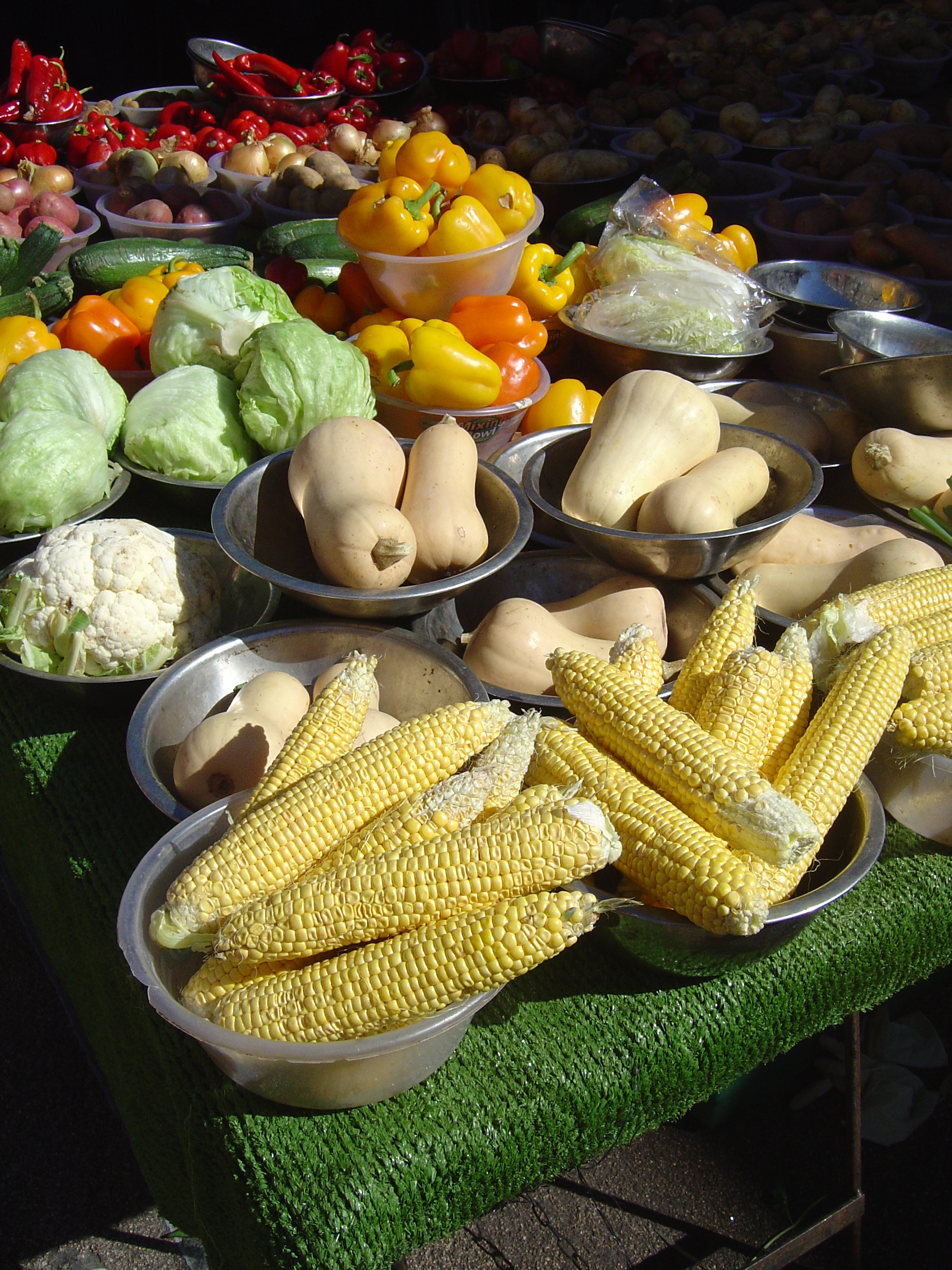

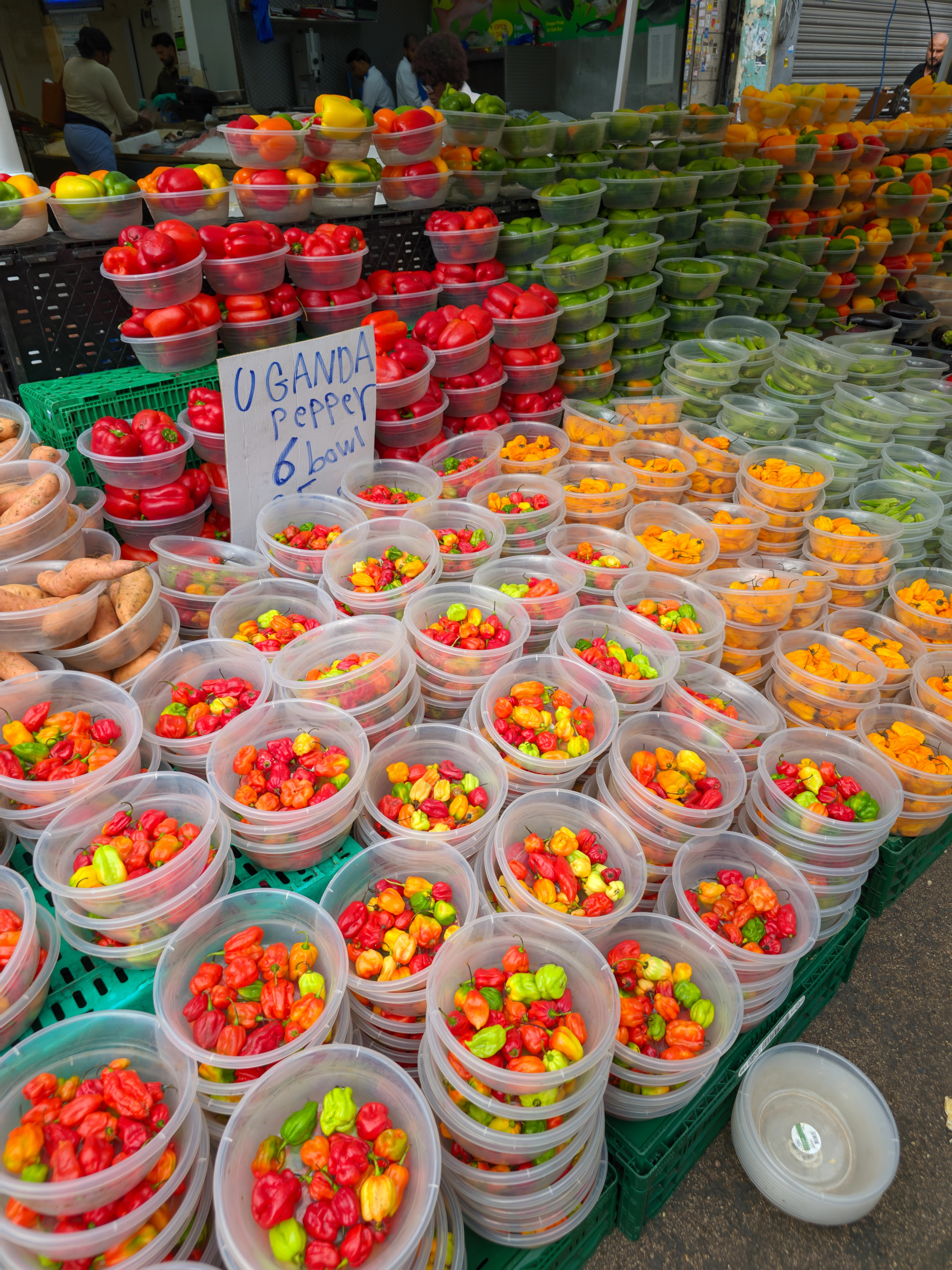
