= Nursery Row Park =

Park in Walworth, London

Coordinates: 51°49′0″N 0°5′29″W

Nursery Row Park is a park in Walworth, London. It is located between Brandon, Stead and Orb Streets, and the East Street Market. It is in the London Borough of Southwark.

== History ==
The early history of the park is complicated, and difficult to establish with certainty. Walworth had been market gardens (hence ‘Nursery Row’), but was heavily built out for residential use in the 19th century. Until the 1980s, there was a commemorative fountain in the park. The inscription on that fountain (now lost) stated that the park was planned in 1885, making use of a grant from Lewis Isaacs, MP for the Walworth division of Newington.

However, there are also records which indicate that the site was acquired in 1897, with funding provided by James Bailey, by then the MP for Walworth, the London County Council and the Vestry of St Mary Newington. The park was then planted and laid out by the Metropolitan Public Gardens Association; some of the London plane trees which were planted by the MPGA still survive. That initial park was called the East Street Recreation Ground, although by the 1970s it was known informally as the Old Swing Park.

In 1980 the park was extended following the demolition of tenements and terraces on Blendon Row, Eltham Street and Nursery Row, and then renamed after the latter street.

Part of the park was zoned for housing in the 2004 Southwark Local Plan. These plans were cancelled in 2010.

The park was renovated in 2006-07, when a meadow and central hill were introduced. The latter hides contaminated rubble. The renovation was undertaken by Farrer Huxley Associates architects and Anna French Associates landscape architects. The park includes two playground areas, a community orchard and a wildflower meadow.

== Conservation ==
The park has been protected as a Field in Trust since 2013.

There are no listed structures in the park.

== Friends of Nursery Row Park ==
There is a Friends of Nursery Row Park organisation, established in 2007. In 2017 the Friends were incorporated as a Community interest company.
