= St Ann Blackfriars =

Former church in the City of London

Coordinates: 51°30′47.46″N 0°6′8.61″W

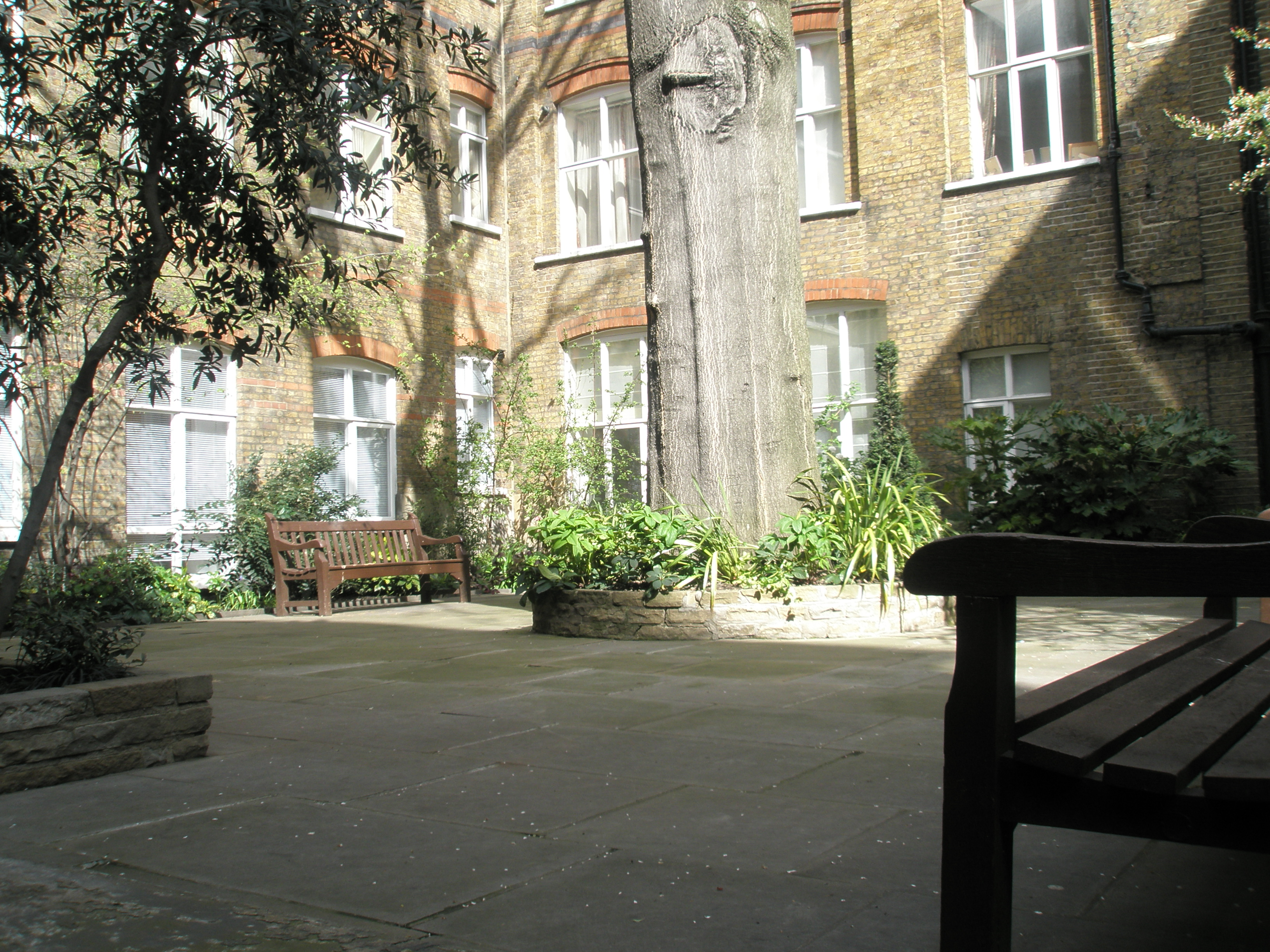
- St Ann's Churchyard in 2008
- St Ann Blackfriars
- Location: Ireland Yard, City of London
- Country: England
- Denomination: Anglican

History
- Founded: 16th century

Architecture
- Demolished: 1666

Administration
- Diocese: Diocese of London

St Ann Blackfriars was a church in the City of London, in what is now Ireland Yard in the ward of Farringdon Within. The church began as a medieval parish chapel, dedicated to St Ann, within the church of the Dominicans (the order after whom the Blackfriars district of London is named). The new parish church was established in the 16th century to serve the inhabitants of the precincts of the former Dominican monastery, following its dissolution under King Henry VIII. It was near the Blackfriars Theatre, a fact which displeased its congregation. It was destroyed in the Great Fire of London of 1666.

== History ==
The church of St Ann was built on part of the site of the monastery of the Dominicans or "Black Friars". The monastery was dissolved by King Henry VIII, and in 1550 the precinct was granted to Sir Thomas Cawarden, the Master of the Revels, who largely demolished the buildings on the site. During the reign of Queen Mary I and King Philip, Cawarden was required to provide a parish church for the residents of the precinct. The interior of the old church having been converted into tennis courts, Cawarden allowed them what John Stow described as "a lodging chamber above a stair". This building fell down in 1597, and the parishioners purchased an additional piece of ground to the west from Sir George Moore, and rebuilt the church on a larger scale. A warehouse was constructed beneath the new part of the church, at the cost of the parishioners, for the use of Sir Jerome Bowes, who held the land under lease. The rebuilt church was consecrated on 11 December 1597 and named "The Church or Chapel of St. Ann, within the Precinct of Blackfriars". The new church was probably adapted from the chapter house of the medieval friary.

In 1613 a further piece of ground was purchased. An aisle was added, and a burial vault constructed underneath; the additions being consecrated on 29 July 1617. In 1642, the building was repaired at a cost of £500.

St Ann's became a Puritan stronghold; for 46 years the minister was William Gouge, who died in 1653, and was buried in the church. Also buried there was the portrait miniature painter Isaac Oliver who died in 1617.

Because it was on former monastic land, St Ann's was a liberty within the City of London and its inhabitants could claim exemption from the rules of the London Guilds. As a result, for many years at the end of the 16th century and in the early 17th, the parish of St Ann's was the home of an unusually large number of talented artists who would otherwise have been regulated by the Painter-Stainers Company. These included some English born painters, but mainly artists born overseas (principally from the Netherlands). Among its inhabitants were van Dyck, Janssens and Isaac Oliver.

The church was destroyed in the Great Fire of London of 1666. It was not rebuilt; instead its parish was united with that of St. Andrew-by-the-Wardrobe. The site of the church was retained for burials, and the church's existing burial ground, on land once occupied by part of the nave of the friary church, also continued in use. This latter site is known as Church Entry. The two graveyards were closed to burials in 1849, and both are now public gardens. They were converted into public gardens by the Metropolitan Public Gardens Association's landscape gardener Madeline Agar in 1907. The gardens are notable for being mostly paved, which was an unusual design for Agar. An annual service still takes place in the churchyard on St. Anne’s Day with clergy and worshipers processing from St. Andrew-by-the-Wardrobe nearby.
