= Emslie Horniman's Pleasance =

Park near Notting Hill, London

Coordinates: 51.5253°N 0.2092°W

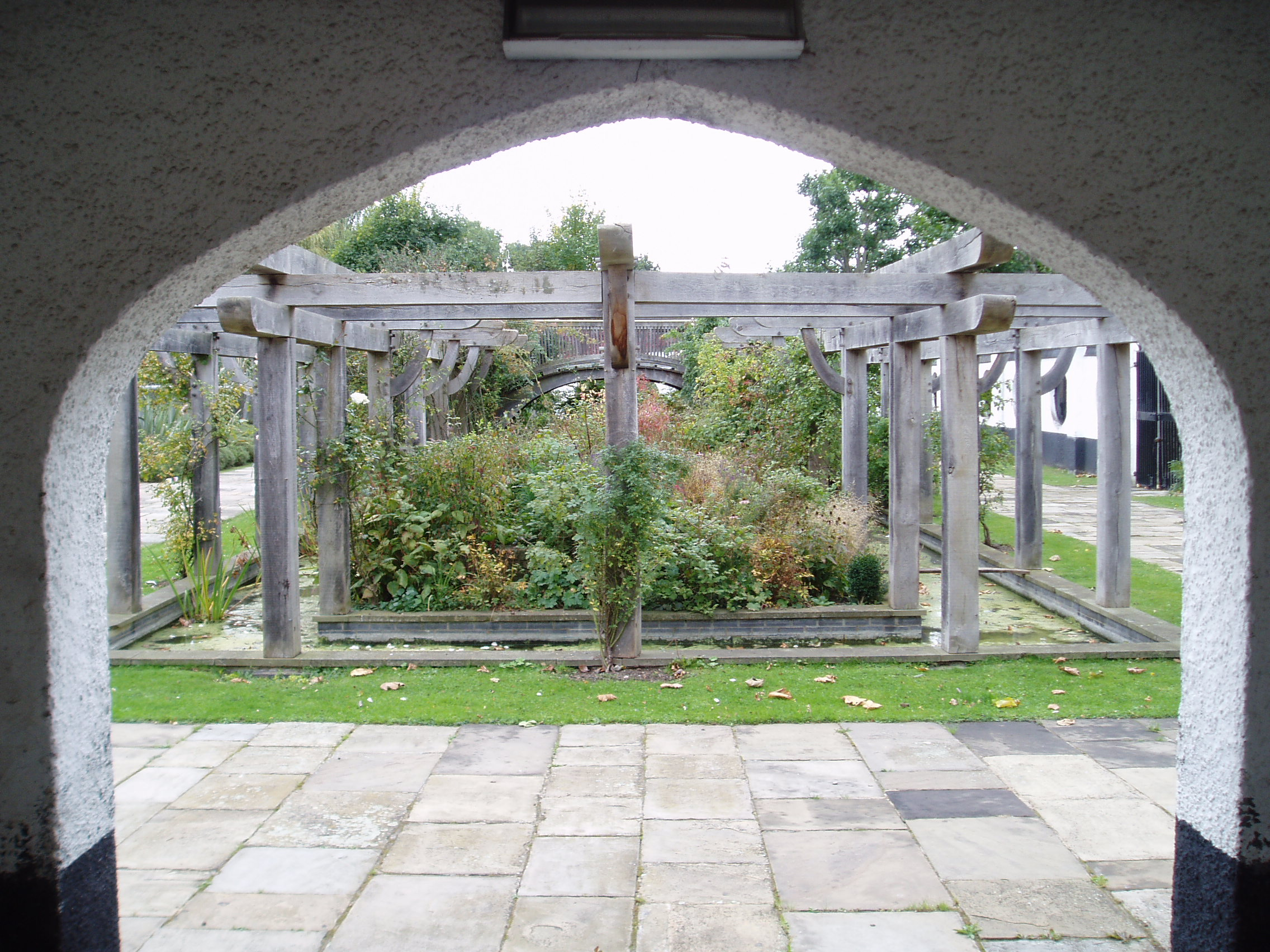
View of the park

Emslie Horniman's Pleasance is a park in Kensal Town, in the Borough of Kensington and Chelsea, London. It is named after the person who created it, Emslie John Horniman the MP for Chelsea (of which Kensal Town was then an exclave). It opened in 1914. The park is the traditional starting point for the Notting Hill Carnival.

The Pleasance contains a notable walled garden in the Arts and Crafts style, designed for Horniman by C.F.A. Voysey and Madeline Agar. Voysey's walls and shelters are Grade II listed on the National Heritage List for England.

It is located on Bosworth Road, Kensal Town, on the southern side of the Grand Union Canal, near to Notting Hill. The nearest tube station is Westbourne Park.

The park also contains tennis courts, five-a-side football pitches, a hard play area and a children's playground.

It was the scene of a tragedy in July 2024, during a family fun day out, in which a 15 year old teen was shot by a member of a gang.

== See also ==
- Trellick Tower
