= Taylors Bulbs =

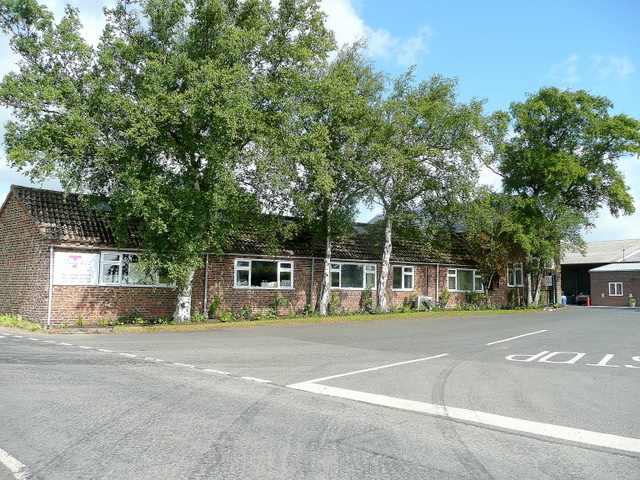
Premises in Holbeach, Lincolnshire, UK, 2009

Taylors Bulbs is a British floriculture company based in Holbeach, Lincolnshire that specialises in sale of daffodil and other flower bulbs.

The company received a royal warrant from King Charles III in 2024. It was founded in 1919 by Otto Augustus Taylor using a government grant for First World War veterans; as of 2026 it was owned by the fourth generation of his family. In 2019 it operated 150 hectares of daffodil fields.
