= Fred Cleary =

British environmentalist and philanthropist (1905–1984)

Fred Cleary CBE
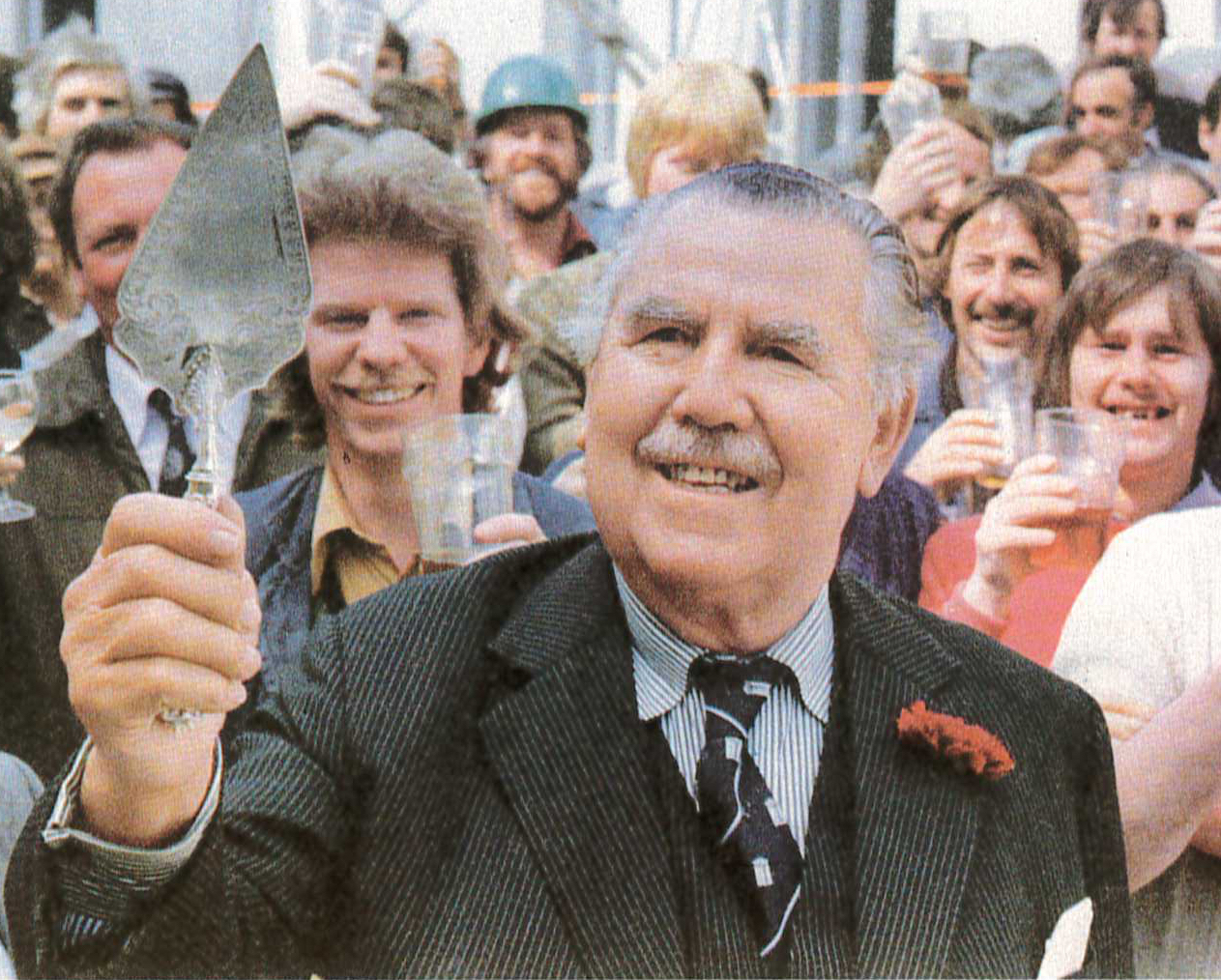
- Cleary in 1982
- Born: Frederick Ernest Cleary; 11 April 1905; Haverstock, Hamstead, England
- Died: 17 June 1984 (aged 79)
- Occupations: Environmentalist; philanthropist
- Spouse: Norah Cleary
- Children: 2

Frederick Ernest Cleary CBE (11 April 1905 – 17 June 1984) was a chartered surveyor and property entrepreneur from Crouch End, London. As the founder of Haslemere Estates, a London-based development company, he was primarily involved in the restoration of existing buildings. Cleary’s philanthropic activities included the founding of two charitable trusts: The Cleary Foundation (1953) and The Bay Trust (1969), an environmental education charity. He also authored three books: Beauty and the Borough (1949), The Flowering City (1969), and I'll Do it Yesterday (1979).

== Early life ==
Cleary was born on 11 April 1905 in a flat on Prince of Wales Road off Haverstock Hill, Hampstead, London. The son of an electrical engineer, he attended Dame Alice Owen's School in North London and qualified as a chartered surveyor at the Northern Polytechnic, Holloway, in 1929. Cleary was married to Norah Cleary and had two daughters.

By the late 1930s, Cleary was living at 9 Waverley Road, Crouch End, near the junction of Haslemere Road. It is claimed that the name for his company was taken from this road.

== Wartime career ==
The role of a Chartered Surveyor was a reserved occupation during the Second World War. Cleary also participated in the war effort in London as an ARP Warden. During this time, he worked at The London Investment & Mortgage Company as a Chartered Surveyor.

== Post-war career ==
Following the end of the Second World War, Cleary co-founded the City & Metropolitan Building Society and remained its chairman for the subsequent 30 years. He also joined Hornsey Council. One example of this work included Grove Lodge Gardens in Muswell Hill. In 1949, Cleary and the Town Clerk successfully acquired the land for Hornsey Council and converted it into a small park. Grove Lodge Gardens featured in his book Beauty and the Borough. In this, Cleary writes: "The fence has gone, revealing the full beauty of very fine trees. The opportunities and the natural beauty of the site have been well used by intelligent planning and artistic garden designing."

Cleary's work at Hornsey Borough Council was environmentally-focused, and he encouraged recycling. In his autobiography, I'll Do It Yesterday (1979), he writes about what people refer to as waste and the efforts of residents in Hornsey Borough to continue to salvage, repurpose, and recycle as much as they can: "I pointed out that in the financial year 1950-51 alone, the 100,000 residents in Hornsey Borough had salvaged 1,550 tons of paper, 1,529 tons of kitchen waste, and 436 tons of metal and other items. Had it not been for the Borough's tremendous efforts during the salvage drive, the Council's estimates would have been exceeded by more than five thousand pounds."

Cleary founded the Cleary Foundation in 1953 (initially named the 'Cleary Charitable Trust'), to assist charities involved in education, the arts, conservation, and the environment, for the most part located in London and Southeast Kent.

From the early 1950s, Cleary advocated for the development of public gardens and open spaces provided by the Corporation of the City of London and others, which led to the informal moniker 'Flowering Fred'.

=== Property renovation ===
Cleary established Haslemere Estates Ltd in 1943, with the purpose of undertaking property renovations for period buildings. In 1958, Cleary retired from The London Investment & Mortgage Company to focus on Haslemere Estates with the support of Frank Collier and Hilda Lupton. The company went public in 1961 and was eventually acquired by Rodamco (part of the Dutch asset management group Robeco) in 1986.

Lord Duncan Sandys, President and Founder of The Civic Trust, wrote about Haslemere Estates saying: "No company has done more than Haslemere Estates to preserve our irreplaceable architectural heritage by the restoration of old buildings and their adaptation to present-day uses. In a striking manner, Haslemere Estates have proved beyond doubt that commercial interests and architectural conservation are by no means incompatible, and can, in fact, be complementary."

Haslemere Estates Limited was dissolved in 2019.

=== Contributions to London's parks and gardens ===
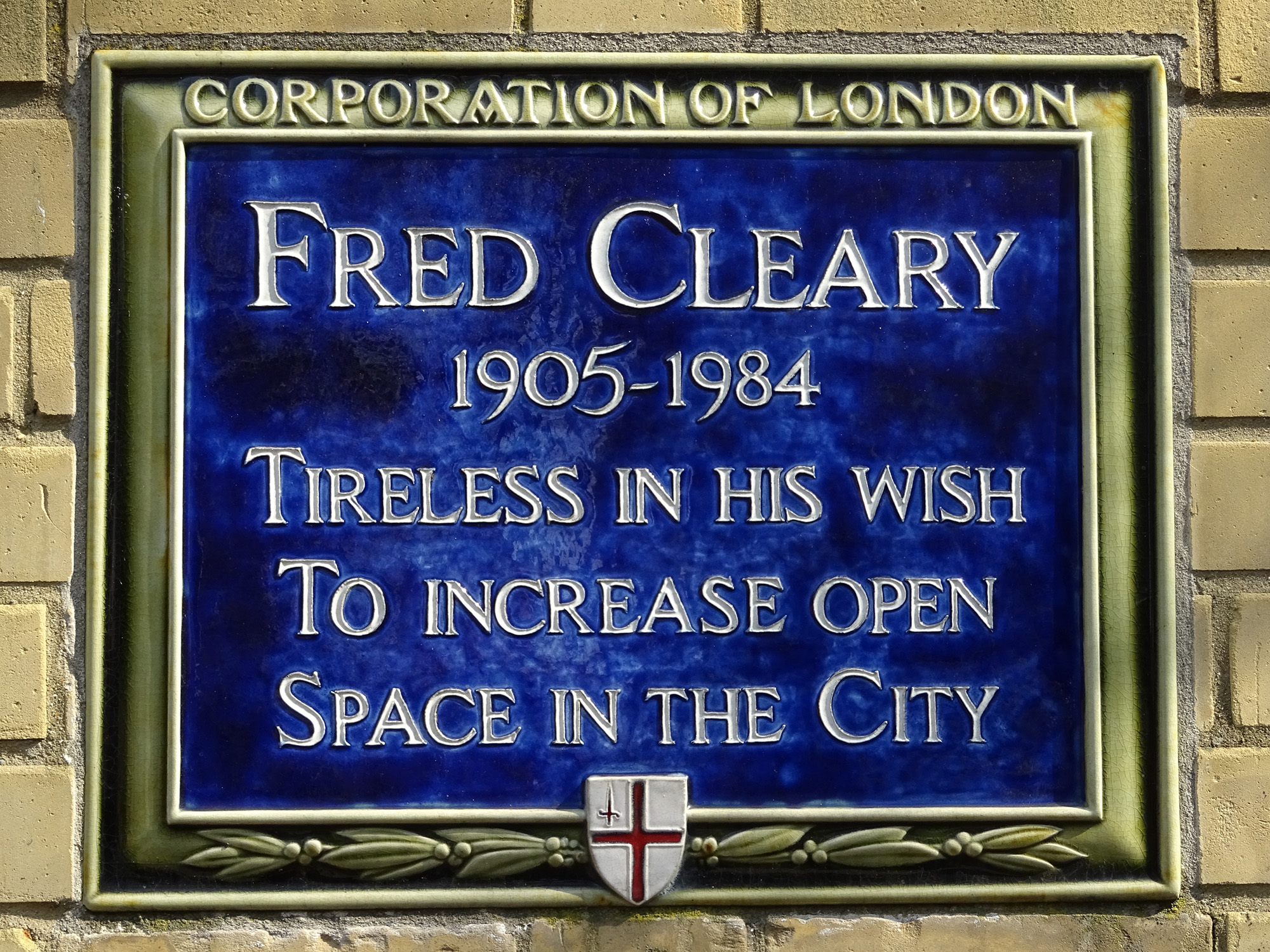
Plaque in The Cleary Garden, Huggin Hill. London EC4

Cleary was a member of the Court of Common Council from 1959 to 1984 and was for three decades also Chairman of The Corporation of the City of London's Trees, Gardens, and Open Spaces Committee and the Metropolitan Public Gardens Association. In these roles, he participated in creating green spaces in the city, frequently on bomb-damaged sites. Over 150 gardens within the City of London were established, refurbished, and maintained during his tenure, redeveloping derelict and war-damaged areas into public gardens. Examples of 'scars of yesterday being turned into the gardens of today' are illustrated in Cleary's books Beauty and the Borough and The Flowering City.

In 1982, to mark their centenary, the Metropolitan Public Gardens Association funded the laying out of Cleary Garden, EC4, Huggin Hill.

=== Life in East Kent ===
As a child, Cleary regularly visited the Kent Coast; his father having served in Dover during the First World War. In the late 1940s, Cleary and his wife Norah, became residents of St. Margaret's Bay. Cleary established and preserved several local sites, including Crabble Corn Mill near Dover and The Landmark Centre in Deal. Cleary established The Bay Trust (The St Margaret's Bay Trust) in 1969, a charity focused on environmental preservation education in the St. Margaret's Bay area. The Bay Trust continues this work to the present day. In 1975, Cleary purchased and refurbished (through the Cleary Foundation) an old rectory building ('Ripple Down House') in Ringwould. The site became an environmental education centre for children known as Rippledown, now run and managed by The Bay Trust. The Bay Museum (later St Margaret's Museum) was opened in August 1989, where much of the collection of local maritime artefacts were collected by Cleary during his life.

== Awards ==
Cleary was awarded an MBE (1951) and CBE (1979) in acknowledgement of his environmental and philanthropic activities. In 1976, Cleary was made an honorary fellow of Magdalene College, Cambridge where he funded the restoration of the Pepys Library and the Cleary Research Fellowship award (which remains available to Land Economy students studying at the college). In 1981, he was awarded the Veitch Memorial Medal by the Royal Horticultural Society in recognition of his services to Gardening in the City of London and elsewhere.
