= Fanny Wilkinson =

British landscape gardener and college principal (1855–1951)

Fanny Rollo Wilkinson
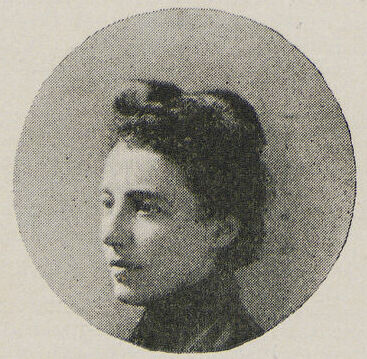
- Fanny Wilkinson in 1899
- Born: 6 June 1855; Chorlton upon Medlock, Manchester, UK
- Died: 22 January 1951 (aged 95); Leiston, Suffolk
- Education: Crystal Palace School of Landscape Gardening and Practical Horticulture
- Known for: Professional landscape gardener
- Notable work: Vauxhall Park, London; Designer for 75 public gardens for Metropolitan Public Gardens Association 1884–1904; Principal, Swanley Horticultural College 1904–1916 and 1921–1922

Fanny Wilkinson (1855–1951) was a British landscape designer. She was the first professional female landscape designer in Britain, and responsible for the design and the layout of more than 75 public gardens across London in the late 19th century.

== Early life ==
Fanny Wilkinson was born in 1855 in Manchester, the daughter of Matthew Eason Wilkinson, a prominent doctor who became president of the British Medical Association, and his wife, Louisa.

== Education ==
She was educated ‘privately and abroad’, but by the end of 1883 she had completed an 18-month course at the Crystal Palace School of Landscape Gardening and Practical Horticulture in London, at a time when such classes were intended only for men. She later said that 'I was always fond of gardening as a child, and I took it up because I felt it suited me, and I wanted to do something ...’. She may have been inspired by the grounds of Middlethorpe Hall, the family residence in Yorkshire.

== Career ==
In 1884 she was elected as honorary gardener to the Metropolitan Public Gardens Association but two years later this was changed to a professional position for which she was paid a fee. In an interview in 1890 she commented that ‘I certainly do not let myself be underpaid as many women do. … I know my profession and charge accordingly, as all women should do.’ Among the many public gardens across London that she planned and that were laid out under her supervision were Goldsmith's Square, Hackney; Myatt's Fields Park, Camberwell; Paddington Street Gardens, Marylebone; Meath Gardens, Bethnal Green; and the churchyard of St John, Smith Square, Westminster.

In 1887 Fanny Wilkinson was also working as a landscape designer to the Kyrle Society, which aimed to ‘bring beauty to the lives of the poor’. Through the society she was commissioned to design Vauxhall Park, opened in 1890. This was created on land saved from development and purchased by Henry Fawcett and Millicent Garrett Fawcett; Millicent and her sisters became good friends of Fanny. Fanny's sister Louisa married Millicent's brother.

In 1902 she became the first female Principal of Swanley Horticultural College and in that post she encouraged other women to enter the profession. She co-founded the Women's Agricultural and Horticultural International Union (1899), through which women were recruited to sustain agriculture and food production during the First World War. The organisation continues as the Working For Gardeners Association.

== Commemoration ==
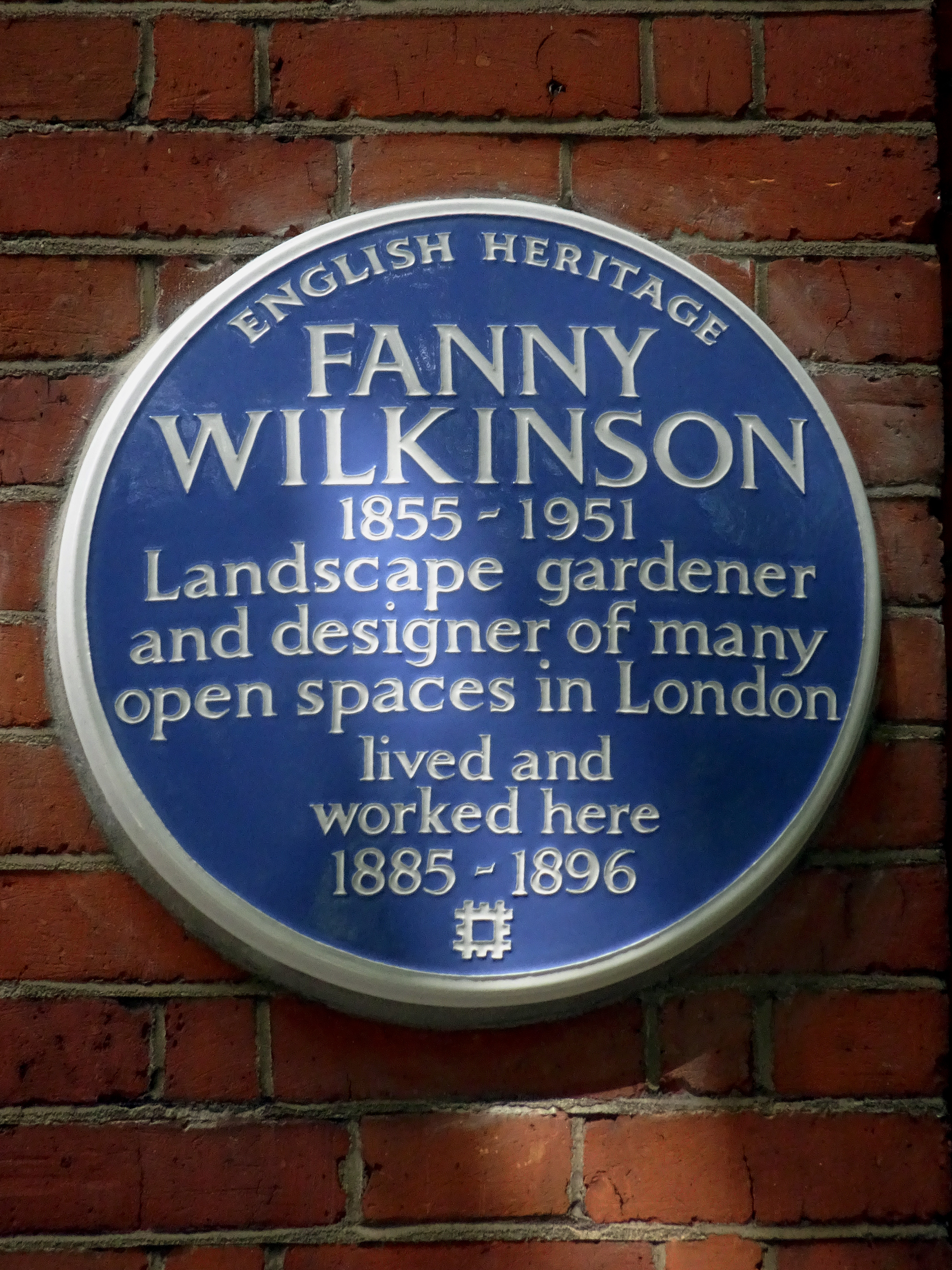
Fanny Wilkinson blue plaque in Bloomsbury

In 2022 English Heritage announced that Fanny Wilkinson would be commemorated with a blue plaque at her former home in Bloomsbury, London, later that year. She was nominated for the plaque by the Metropolitan Public Gardens Association, the organisation which kickstarted her professional career.

In 2025 a commemorative bronze statue of Fanny Wilkinson was installed on a renovated Edwardian drinking fountain in Coronation Gardens, Wandsworth, London, one of the gardens she designed.
