= ABS =

ABS usually refers to:

- Acrylonitrile butadiene styrene, a common plastics polymer
- Anti-lock braking system, in vehicles

Abs usually refers to:

- Rectus abdominis muscle ("abdominal muscle" or "abs") of humans and some mammals
- Abdominal muscles, colloquially

ABS or Abs may also refer to:

== Arts and media ==
=== Broadcasting ===
- ABS (TV station), Australian Broadcasting Corporation's television station in Adelaide, Australia
- ABS network (Arab Broadcasting Services)
- ABS-CBN Corporation, a Philippine media company
  - Alto Broadcasting System, an older name for the media company mentioned above
  - ABS-CBN, the namesake media network
- Akita Broadcasting System, Japan
- Amalgamated Broadcasting System, former US radio network
- American Broadcasting System, former name of the ABC (American Broadcasting Company) TV network after its Blue Network predecessor was sold to Edward J. Noble
- Antigua Broadcasting Service, state broadcaster of Antigua and Barbuda

=== Music ===
- A.B.'s, a Japanese 1980s instrumental band
- American Bach Soloists, chamber music ensemble
- Abz Love, British singer

=== Other media ===
- Abs Denham, a fictional character in Casualty

== Organizations ==
=== Companies ===
- ABS Free Dish, a Bermuda-based television service
- ABS (satellite operator), Amit Somani, Dubai, formerly Asia Broadcast Satellite
- ABS Capital Partners, Baltimore, Maryland, US
- Alternative Bank Schweiz, Solothurn, Switzerland
- American Bladesmith Society
- ABS Global, formerly American Breeders Service
- ABS Building Society, Australia
- Acciaierie Bertoli Safau, an Italian steel mill

=== Other organizations ===
- ABS FC, a football club from Ilorin, Nigeria
- American Bible Society
- American Bladesmith Society
- American Boy Scouts, an early Scouting organization
- American Bureau of Shipping, a shipping classification society
- Association of Broadcasting Staff, a former British broadcasting trade union
- Aston Business School, Birmingham, England, UK
- Australian Bureau of Statistics

== Places ==
- Abu Simbel Airport in Aswan Governorate, Egypt (IATA airport code ABS)
- Archbold Biological Station, a research institute in Florida, US
- Abs district, Hajjah Governorate, Yemen
- Abs (Yemen), a town

== Science and technology ==
=== Biology and medicine ===
- Rectus abdominis muscle ("abdominal muscle" or "abs") of humans and some mammals
- Abdominal muscles , colloquially
- Amniotic band syndrome, a congenital disorder
- Cis-abienol synthase, an enzyme
- Ankaferd BloodStopper, an antihemorrhagic
- Auto-brewery syndrome, ethanol produced in the digestive system
- Aqueous biphasic system, for solvent extraction

=== Other uses in science and technology ===
- ABS, in linguistics, glossing abbreviation for absolutive case
- Absolute value, function in mathematics and computing
- Acrylonitrile butadiene styrene, a common plastics polymer
- Adaptive bitrate streaming
- Aerial base station, a flying antenna system
- Anti-lock braking system, in vehicles
- Anton-Babinski syndrome, in neurology; rare symptom of brain damage
- Arch Build System, in Arch Linux
- Automated Ball-Strike System, in baseball
- Automatic block signaling, a railroad communications system that controls the movement of trains

== Other uses ==
- Abs (surname), list of people with the name
- Ambonese Malay (ISO 639-3 code), a Malay creole of Indonesia
- Asset-backed security, in finance
- Advanced British Standard, a proposed British educational qualification
- Nagoya Protocol on Access and Benefit Sharing, supplementary to the Convention on Biological Diversity

== See also ==
- AB (disambiguation), including AB, Ab, ab; for the singular of ABs, Abs, abs
