= Greater Bank =

Australian bank

- Formerly: Greater Building Society
- Type: Mutual bank
- Industry: Banking and financial services
- Founded: 1945; 81 years ago
- Headquarters: Hamilton, New South Wales, Australia
- Number of locations: 59 branches
- Key people: Samantha Martin-Williams (Chair), Bernadette Inglis (CEO)
- Products: Retail Banking
- Parent: NGM Group
- Website: www.greater.com.au

Greater Bank is an Australian customer-owned bank and now a brand of Newcastle Greater Mutual Group, an organisation formed through the merger between Greater Bank and Newcastle Permanent Building Society.

The bank was earlier known as the Greater Building Society, or simply "The Greater”, and provides services to customers in New South Wales and southeast Queensland through branches, mobile lenders, its own ATM network, access to the Westpac ATM network, Online banking, app and a Newcastle-based customer service call centre.

The bank is licensed by the Australian Securities & Investments Commission, is regulated by Australian Prudential Regulatory Authority as a bank and authorised deposit-taking institution, and is a member of the Customer Owned Banking Association (COBA). In 2013, the bank was named Building Society of the Year for customer satisfaction by Roy Morgan, as judged by more than 50,000 consumers and 22,000 business decision-makers. This was followed up by wins in the Roy Morgan Bank of the Year category in 2016 & 2017.

== History ==
In 1924, Mr F.W. Lean and Mr K.A. Mathieson Snr formed the Newcastle and Hunter River Public Service Starr-Bowkett Society Building Co-operative Society Limited that provided interest-free home loans to their members, who each bought shares and made weekly contributions to the society. A lottery would then determine which member received the loan. The average lifespan of these terminating societies was 30 years.

This would be the foundations of what would become The Greater Newcastle Co-operative Permanent Building and Investment Society in 1945.

In 1968, the building society started to expand beyond its traditional Hunter, boundaries, opening a branch in Gosford on the Central Coast. By 1993 the branch network operated from the Illawarra region on the South Coast, out to the Central West and New England Regions and through to the North Coast of NSW.

It was at this time that “Newcastle” was dropped from its name to better reflect the breadth of communities it served.

In 2003, Greater Building Society's operations expanded into Queensland with the establishment of a Gold Coast branch at Robina.

== Advertising ==
In 2010, Australian marketer John Dwyer tempted actor Jerry Seinfeld out of retirement, to be spokesman for the bank. Seinfeld had only ever lent his name to two marketing campaigns; American Express and Microsoft. Seinfeld starred in the company's advertising campaigns for three years. The comedian's tenure as spokesperson for the Bank marked a rise in brand awareness both locally and nationally.

== From Building Society to Bank ==
In May 2016, after receiving approval from the Australian Prudential Regulatory Authority (APRA), the society changed its name to Greater Bank. The ownership structure did not change, remaining as a mutual bank owned by customers, rather than shareholders.

== Community ==
The bank established The Greater Charitable Foundation in 2011. The Foundation partners with Australian-based charitable organisations throughout the bank's area of operations with a goal of improving life outcomes and supporting families and communities.

The Foundation was established with an initial allocation of $1 million by the bank on behalf of its members and staff. The bank continues to fund the Foundation from its profits on an ongoing basis, and the Foundation is governed by an independent Board of Directors. A key platform of the Foundation's activities is the involvement of the bank's staff in funded projects through volunteering and pro bono assistance.

== Mergers ==
In 1998, Greater Building Society merged with the Mitchell Building Society of Central Western NSW, enabling it to establish a presence in the NSW Central West cities of Bathurst, Dubbo and Orange. The 2011 merger with ABS Building Society of Armidale enabled the organisation to expand its reach in the New England Region.

Greater Bank's most significant merger occurred in 2023 when it linked with Newcastle Permanent Building Society to form Newcastle Greater Mutual Group.

The merger was approved by members of both organisations who voted overwhelmingly in favour of the proposal at a special general meeting held on 2 November 2022.

APRA's approval of the merger in December 2022 provided the greenlight for the establishment of the $20 billion Newcastle Greater Mutual Group, which officially began operating 1 March 2023. In 2023, the group was ranked the 10th largest Australian-owned bank and the largest mutual by net assets and capital base.

The Greater Bank and Newcastle Permanent brands continue to service more than 620,000 customers.
