= Air-to-ground communication =

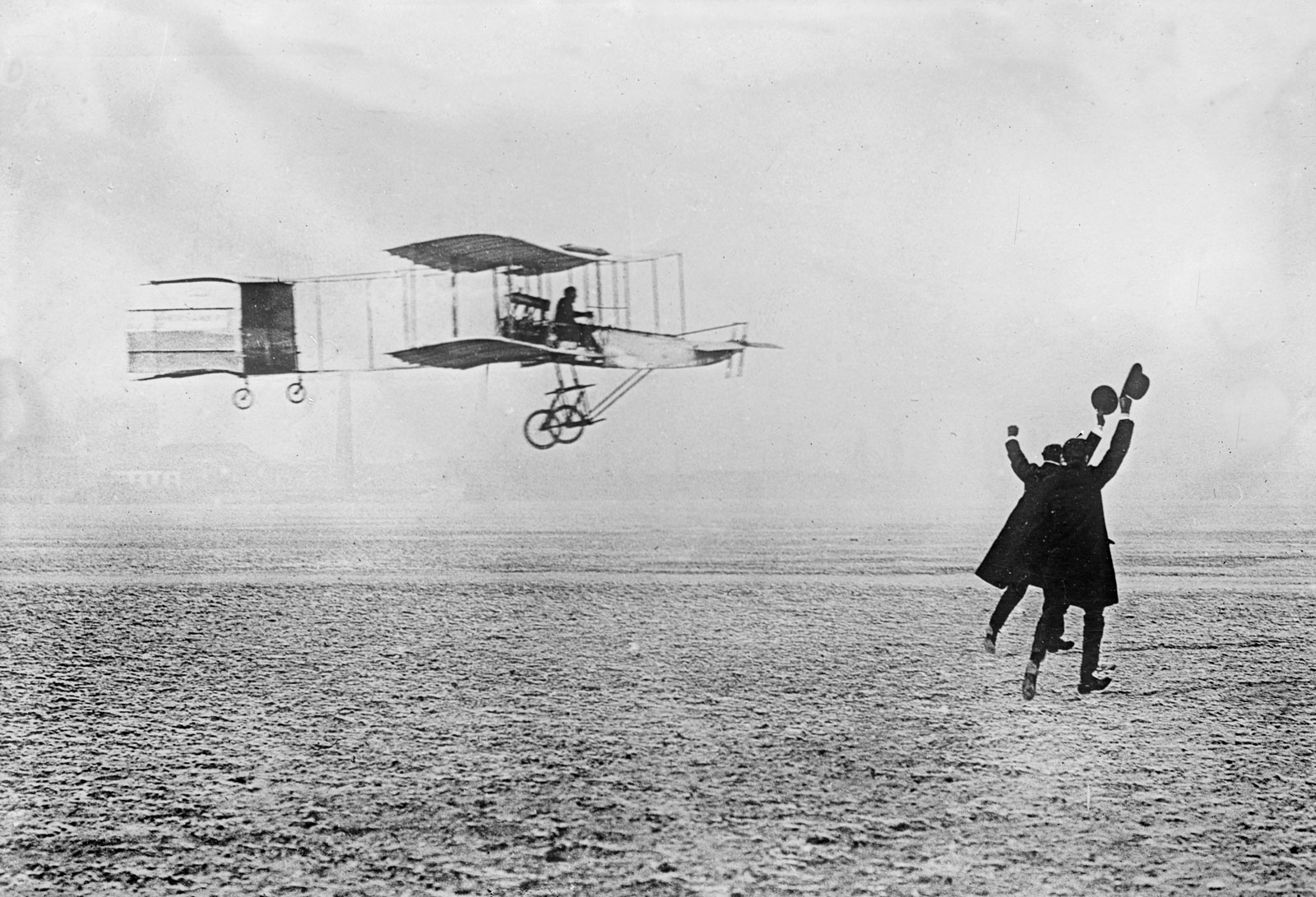
The earliest communication with aircraft was by visual signalling, ground-to-air only

Air-to-ground communication was first made possible by the development of two-way aerial telegraphy in 1912, soon followed by two-way radio. By the Second World War, radio had become the chief medium of air-to-ground and air-to-air communication. Since then, transponders have enabled pilots and controllers to identify planes automatically, greatly improving air security. Most recently, in addition to sophisticated radio and GPS systems, the unmanned aerial vehicle, or drone, has revolutionised aerial surveillance and combat.

== Early systems ==
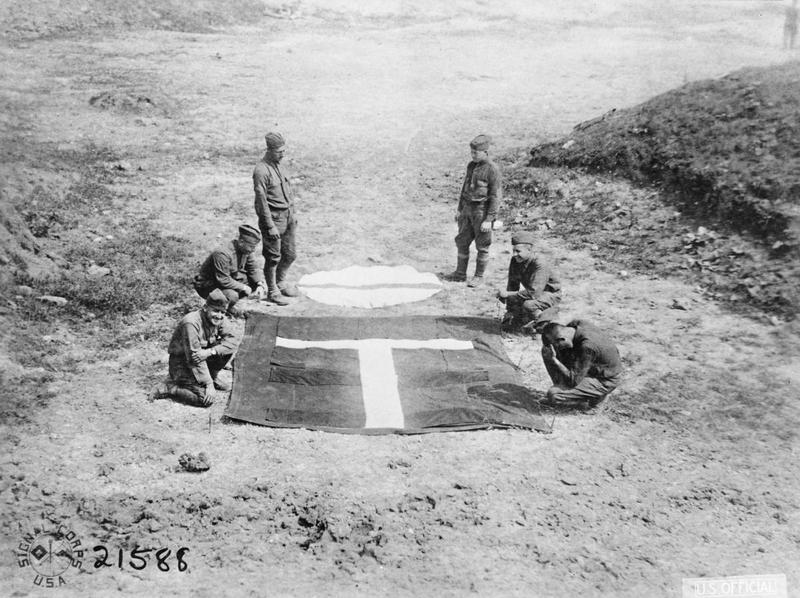
The Popham panel in use by the U.S. Army at Beauval, 1918.

The early days of flight proved quite difficult for air-to-ground communication. Ground crews would rely on colored paddles, hand signs and other visual aids. This was effective for ground crews, but it offered no way for pilots to communicate back. In the beginning of World War I planes were not outfitted with radios, so soldiers used large panel cut outs to distinguish friendly forces. These cut outs could also be used as a directional device to help pilots navigate back to friendly airfields.

As technology developed, planes were able to use telegraph systems to send messages in Morse code. Telegraphs used a plunger to complete an electric circuit. When the circuit was completed it sent out a signal as a dot or a dash. By depressing the plunger device in a rhythmic pattern a telegraph operator could spell out words, with each dot-dash sequence representing a corresponding letter in a word. Using this technology planes were able to call in accurate artillery fire and act as forward observers.

In 1912 the Royal Flying Corps had begun experimenting with "wireless telegraphy" in aircraft. Lieutenant B.T James was a leading pioneer of wireless (radio) in aircraft. In the spring 1913, he had begun to experiment with radios in a B.E.2a. James brought the science of wireless in aircraft to a high state of efficiency before he was shot down and killed by anti-aircraft fire on 13 July 1915.

In April 1915 Captain J.M. Furnival was the first person to hear a voice from the ground when Major Prince said "If you can hear me now it will be the first time speech has ever been communicated to an aeroplane in flight." In June 1915 the world's first air-to-ground voice transmission took place at Brooklands (England) over about 20miles (ground-to-air was initially by morse but it is believed two-way voice communications was being achieved by July 1915). In early 1916 the Marconi Company (England) started production of air-to-ground radio transmitters/receivers which were used in the war over France.

In 1917 AT&T invented the first American air-to-ground radio transmitter. They tested this device at Langley Field in Virginia and found it was a viable technology. In May 1917, General George Squier of the U.S. Army Signal Corps contacted AT&T to develop an air-to-ground radio with a range of 2,000 yards. By July 4 of that same year AT&T technicians achieved two-way communication between pilots and ground personnel. This allowed ground personnel to communicate directly with pilots using their voice instead of morse code. Though few of these devices saw service in the war, they proved this was a viable and valuable technology worthy of refinement and advancement therefore further models had this technology installed into Biplanes on airstrips in France 1919.

== The inter-war years ==
Following World War I new technology was developed to increase the range and performance of the radios being used to communicate with planes in the air. It was not until 1930 however that airborne radios were reliable enough and had enough power to make them viable to be standard in all planes. Until this point only planes designated for scout missions required radios. The operating distance of radios increased much slower than the distance planes were able to travel. This resulted in planes messages having to bounce from airfield to airfield in order to get to its intended recipient. As the speed of planes increased this resulted in a plane reaching its destination before the message, that it was on its way, arrived.

On 15 November 1938 the Army Airways Communications System (AACS) was established, this system was a point-to-point communications system used by the Army Air Corps. It allowed army air fields to remain in contact with planes throughout their entire flight. It could also be used to disseminate weather reports and orders to military aircraft and act as an air traffic control for arrivals and departures at military airfields. As technology increased systems such as the AACS expanded and spread across the globe as other militaries and civilian services developed their own system of air control.

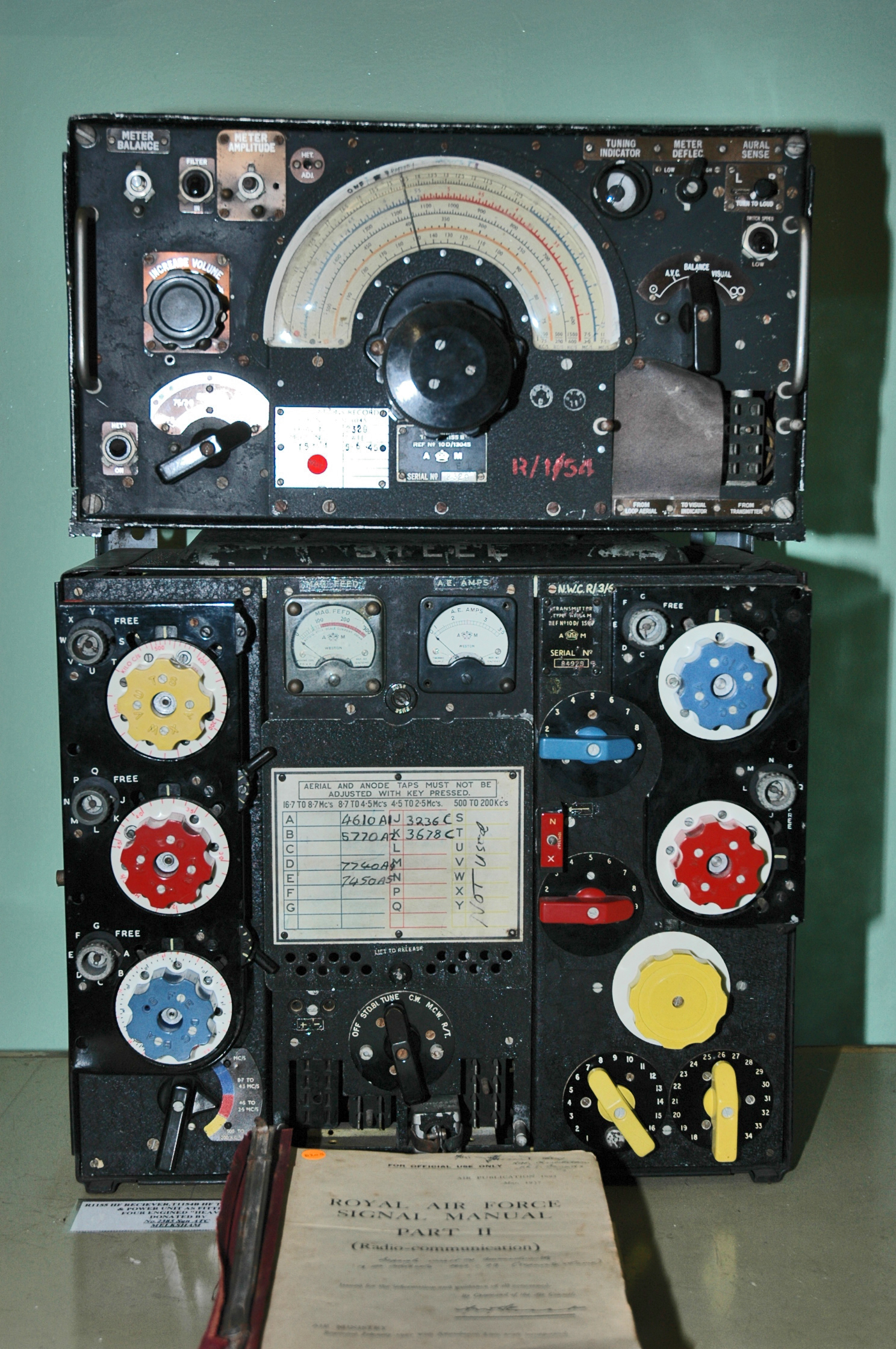
The R1155/T1154 combination used by the RAF in WWII

== World War II ==
The development of radar in the mid-1930s proved a great advance in air-to-ground communication. Radar could be used to track planes in the air and determine distance, direction, speed and even type of aircraft. This allowed for better air traffic control as well as navigation aides for pilots. Radar also proved to be a valuable tool in targeting for bombers. Radar stations on the coast of Britain could aim two radar beams from separate locations on the coast towards Germany. By aligning the two radar beams to intersect over the desired target, a town or factory for example, a bomber could then follow one radar signal until it intersected with the other where he would then know to drop his bombs.

The Royal Air Force used the R1155/T1154 receiver/transmitter combination in most of its larger aircraft, particularly the Avro Lancaster and Short Sunderland. Single seat aircraft such as the Spitfire and Hurricane were equipped mostly with the TR1143 set. Other systems employed were Eureka and the S-Phone, which enabled Special Operations Executive agents working behind enemy lines to communicate with friendly aircraft and coordinate landings and the dropping of agents and supplies.

== Today ==
Radar is still used as an invaluable tool in air to ground communications. Today every plane in the air is tracked by Air Traffic control towers across the US. Most planes in the US and all Commercial planes carry a device known as a transponder. The transponder acts as an identification tool for aircraft allowing ATC towers to immediately recognize the identity of each plane. They work by recognizing radar frequencies as they interact with the plane. The transponder alerted by the radar responds by sending a signal of its own back to the Tower, which identifies the aircraft. Transponders can be used to avoid collisions with other aircraft and with the ground.

Today Air-to Ground communication has evolved to the point where pilots no longer need to be in the plane to fly it. These planes are known as unmanned aerial vehicles or more commonly UAVs. The US military uses several types of UAVs, these include the Predator, Reaper and Global Hawk drones. These drones are used for video surveillance and more recently air to ground attacks. These aircraft represent the pinnacle of Air-to-Ground communications. They can be controlled by pilots thousands of miles away and can safely navigate treacherous terrain using ground mapping radars. They are able to transmit high-resolution video to military stations across the globe. Not all UAVs are used for military purposes however. Some are equipped with high tech sensors, which enable them to survey the ground. These sensors are able to be used for geographical surveys to map the earth and look for oil and mineral deposits.

Despite nearly a century of innovation in air-to-ground communications, many of the original techniques used to communicate with the ground are used by today’s aircraft. Planes landing at night are guided into the runway by a series of intricate lighting arrangements. These visual aids allow pilots to orient themselves in zero visibility situations. Military personnel also rely heavily on visual aides to distinguish themselves and enemy. All Army ACU uniforms include what are known as IR tabs which when viewed through night vision goggles glow bright, US Helicopter pilots can distinguish between soldiers on the ground and the enemy by these tabs. Army Pathfinders also use colored smoke, brightly colored panels and infrared strobe lights to mark suitable landing areas for helicopters.

== See also ==
- Air to Ground channel
- Airband
- Air navigation
- Aircraft marshalling
