= OpenLTE =

Open source implementation of LTE standards

- Original authors: Ben Wojtowicz, Dennis M Senyonjo
- Developers: Ben Wojtowicz, Andrew Murphy, Ziming He, Przemek Bereski, Dennis M Senyonjo
- Stable release: 00.21.0 / February 14, 2021; 5 years ago
- Written in: C++
- Operating system: Linux
- License: Affero General Public License
- Website: openlte.sourceforge.net

OpenLTE is an open source implementation of the 3GPP LTE specifications. In the current version, it includes an eNodeB with a built-in simple Evolved Packet Core, and some tools for scanning and recording LTE signals based on GNU Radio.

OpenLTE is used extensively in a variety of projects, from deployment of custom built 4G cellular networks, evaluating dynamic spectrum sharing for 5G NR and 4G LTE Coexistence to penetration testing of existing telecom networks.

== See also ==
- Universal Software Radio Peripheral
- LTE (telecommunication)
- E-UTRA
