= List of software-defined radios =

This article provides a list of commercially available software-defined radio receivers.

Name	Unit cost (2024)	Type	Production status	Frequency range	Max bandwidth	RX ADC bits	TX DAC bits	TX capable	Sampling rate	Frequency accuracy ppm	Panadapters / Receivers	Host Interface	Windows	Linux	Mac	FPGA
Aaronia SPECTRAN V6 ECO	2,498 EUR	Pre-built	Active	9 kHz – 8 GHz	Up to 120 MHz (2 Rx with 60 MHz each)	16	14	Yes	2 GSPS	0.005 (OCXO option)	2/1	Embedded or True IQ data via 1 x USB 3.1 GEN 1. Internet remote via HTTP / JSON	Yes	Yes	No	1 x XC7A200T-2 (930 GMACs)
Aaronia SPECTRAN V6 PLUS	9,998 EUR	Pre-built	Active	10 MHz – 8 GHz (planned modules for 9 kHz – 26 GHz; 9 kHz – 55 GHz, and 9 kHz – 70 GHz)	Up to 490 MHz (2 Rx with 245 MHz each)	16	14	Yes	2 GSPS	0.005 (OCXO option)	2/1/3	Embedded or True IQ data via 1 x or 2 x USB 3.0. Optional 1 x USB 3.1 GEN2 (power only). Internet remote via HTTP / JSON	Yes	Yes	No	1 x XC7A200T-2 (930 GMACs)
Aaronia SPECTRAN V6 Command Center	24,980 EUR	Pre-built	Active	10 MHz – 8 GHz (planned extensions for 9 kHz – 26 GHz; 9 kHz – 55 GHz, and 9 kHz – 70 GHz)	Up to 980 MHz (4 Rx with 245 MHz each)	16	14	Yes	8 GSPS	0.005 (OCXO option)	8/4/12	Full IQ and/or Spectra data rate streaming. Fixed Workstation/PC integration.	Yes	Yes	No	4 x XC7A200T-2 (930 GMACs each)
Aaronia SPECTRAN V6 ENTERPRISE	59,980 EUR	Pre-built	Active	10 MHz – 8 GHz (planned extensions for 9 kHz – 26 GHz; 9 kHz – 55 GHz, and 9 kHz – 70 GHz)	Up to 3000 MHz (12 Rx with 245 MHz each)	16	14	Yes	24 GSPS	0.005 (OCXO option)	24/12/36	Full IQ and/or Spectra data rate streaming. Remote via 2 x 100 GbE.	Yes	Yes	No	12 x XC7A200T-2 (930 GMACs each)
ADAT ADT-200A		Pre-built	Discontinued	10 kHz – 30 MHz (planned modules for 50 – 54 MHz, 70.0 – 70.5 MHz, and 144 – 148 MHz)	0.5 – 100 kHz	?			?		1/3	Embedded system (no computer needed), USB, Internet remote	Yes, with option R-1 & ADAT Commander	?	?	
AD-FMCOMMS2-EBZ		Pre-built	Active	2.4 – 2.5 GHz		12	12	Yes	61.44 MSPS		2/2	FMC (to Xilinx board) then USB 2.0 or Gigabit Ethernet.	Yes	Yes	Yes	
AD-FMCOMMS3-EBZ		Pre-built	Active	70 MHz – 6 GHz	54 MHz due to filter	12	12	Yes	61.44 MSPS		2/2	FMC (to Xilinx board) then USB 2.0 or Gigabit Ethernet.	Yes	Yes	Yes	
AD-FMCOMMS4-EBZ		Pre-built	Active	70 MHz – 6 GHz	54 MHz due to filter	12	12	Yes	61.44 MSPS		1/1	FMC (to Xilinx board) then USB 2.0 or Gigabit Ethernet.	Yes	Yes	Yes	
AD-FMCOMMS5-EBZ		Pre-built	Active	70 MHz – 6 GHz	54 MHz due to filter	12	12	Yes	61.44 MSPS		4/4	FMC (to Xilinx board) then USB 2.0 or Gigabit Ethernet.	Yes	Yes	Yes	
ADALM-PLUTO		Pre-built	Active	325 MHz – 3.8 GHz (70 MHz – 6 GHz with software modification)	20 MHz (streaming may be less due to USB 2.0)	12	12	Yes	61.44 MSPS		1/1	USB 2.0, Ethernet & WLAN with USB-OTG adapter	Yes	Yes	Yes	Xilinx Zynq Z-7010
AFEDRI SDR		Pre-built	Active	30 kHz – 35 MHz, 35 MHz – 1700 MHz	2.3 MHz	12		No	80 MSPS		0/2	USB 2.0, 10/100 Ethernet	Yes	Yes	Yes	
AirSpy R2	169.00 (USD) Only offered though third party approved vendors.	Pre-built	Active	24 – 1700 MHz	10 MHz	12	N/A	No	10 MSPS MSps ADC sampling, up to 80 MSPS for custom applications	0.5	0/1	USB	Yes	Yes	Yes using ports	none
AirSpy Mini	99.00 (USD) Only offered though third party approved vendors.	Pre-built	Active	24 – 1700 MHz	10 MHz	12	N/A	No	10 MSPS MSps ADC sampling, up to 80 MSPS for custom applications	0.5	0/1	USB	Yes	Yes	Yes using ports	none
AirspyHF+	169.00 (USD) Only offered though third party approved vendors.	Pre-built	Active	9 kHz - 31 MHz 60 MHz - 260 MHz	660 kHz	18	N/A	No	36 MSPS	0.5	0/1	USB	Yes	Yes	Yes	
Antsdr		Pre-built	Active	325 MHz – 3.8 GHz(ad9363) 70 MHz – 6 GHz (ad9631)	200 kHz-20 MHz(ad9363) 200 kHz-56 MHz (ad9361)	12	12	Yes	61.44 MSPS	-+2	1/1	USB 2.0 serial/console/power, Gigabit Ethernet, microSD	No	(ubuntu, maybe debian)	No	Xilinx Zynq Z-7020
Apache Labs ANAN-10E		Pre-built		10 kHz – 55 MHz		14	?	Yes 10 W	122.88 Msps		0/2	Gigabit Ethernet	Yes	Yes	Yes	
Apache Labs ANAN-10/100		Pre-built		10 kHz – 55 MHz		16	?	Yes 10/100 W	122.88 Msps		0/4	Gigabit Ethernet	Yes	Yes	Yes	
Apache Labs ANAN-100D/200D		Pre-built		10 kHz – 55 MHz		16	?	Yes 100 W	122.88 Msps		0/7	Gigabit Ethernet	Yes	Yes	Yes	
Apache Labs ANAN-7000DLE		Pre-built		9 kHz – 60 MHz		16	16	Yes 100 W	?		0/7	Gigabit Ethernet	Yes	Yes	Yes	
Apache Labs ANAN-8000DLE		Pre-built		0 - 61.44 MHz		16	16	Yes 200 W	?		0/7	Gigabit Ethernet	Yes	Yes	Yes	Altera Cyclone IV
AOR AR-2300		Pre-built		40 kHz – 3.15 GHz		?	N/A	No	65 MSPS		1/1	Embedded system (no computer needed), USB	Yes	?	?	
ARSP / Wideband MIMO		early kit / pre-built		400 MHz – 4.4 GHz		?	?		8 MHz streaming / 50 MHz		?	USB 2.0	Yes	Yes	No	
ASR-2300		Pre-Built / Open Source Design		300 MHz – 3.8 GHz, two general wideband RX and selectable GPS, ISM, PCS, UHF RX bands		?	?		<40 MHz (Programmable)		0/2	USB 3.0 SuperSpeed	Yes	Yes	Yes	
Bitshark Express RX		Kit		300 MHz – 4 GHz		?			105 MSPS (RX only)		0/1 ?	PCIe	Yes	Yes	?	
bladeRF		Pre-built		300 MHz – 3.8 GHz	28 MHz	12	12	Yes	80 kSPS – 40 MSPS	1	?	USB 3.0 SuperSpeed	Yes	Yes	Yes	Altera Cyclone 4 E
bladeRF 2.0 micro		Pre-built		47 MHz – 6 GHz	56 MHz	12	12	Yes	61.44 MSPS		2/2	USB 3.0 SuperSpeed	Yes	Yes	Yes	Altera Cyclone V
CaribouLite		Pre-built		30 MHz – 6 GHz	2.5 MHz	13	13	Yes	4 MSPS		1/1	Raspberry Pi 40-pin header	No	Yes	No	
ColibriDDC		Pre-built		10 kHz – 62.5 MHz, up to 800 MHz (oversampling)	38 – 312 kHz	14	N/A	No	125 MSPS		3/4	10/100 Ethernet	Yes	Yes	?	
COM-3011		Pre-built		20 MHz – 3 GHz		ext		No	External ADC required (I/Q output)		?	USB	Yes	?	?	
Crimson TNG		Pre-built		DC – 6 GHz	> 1200 MHz (4 independent RX chains and 4 independent TX chains, each capable of up to 322 MHz of RF bandwidth)	16	16	Yes	Four dual channel, 16 bit, 370 MSPS ADCs; Two quad channel, 16 bit, 2500 MSPS DACs		4/4	2x 10Gbit/s SFP+, Ethernet	Yes	Yes	Yes	
Cross Country Wireless SDR receiver v. 3		Pre-built		472 – 479 kHz, 7.0–7.3 MHz/10.10–10.15 MHz, and 14.00–14.35 MHz		ext		No	External ADC required (I/Q output)		1/1	Crystal controlled two channels	Yes	Yes	Yes	
Cyan		Pre-built		100 kHz – 18 GHz	1 – 3 GHz (8 fully independent Rx chains and 8 fully independent Tx chains, each capable of up to 1 GHz of RF bandwidth)	16	16	Yes	1–3 GSPS ADCs; 2.5 GSPS DACs		1 – 16 receive and 1 – 16 transmit (total of 16 radio chains)	4x 40Gbit/s QSFP, Ethernet	Yes	Yes	Yes	Intel Stratix 10 SoC
DRB 30		Pre-built		30 kHz – 30 MHz		ext			External ADC required (I/Q output)		?	LPT parallel port	Up to XP	?	?	
DX Patrol		Pre-built		100 kHz – 2 GHz (RTL2832U, R820T, 40 MHz upconverter)		8		No	2.4 (up to 3.2) Msps		?	USB	Yes	?	?	
easySDR USB Dongle		Pre-built		64 – 1700 MHz		?	N/A	No	48, 96 kHz		0/1	USB	Yes	No	No	
Elektor SDR		Bare PCB and pre-built		150 kHz – 30 MHz		?		No	Soundcard ADC: 48, 96, and 192 kHz		0/1	USB	Yes	Yes	Yes	
Elektor AVR SDR		Kit and pre-built		up to 1 MHz in undersampling		?			up to 15 kS/s		0/1	UART via RS2-232 converter or USB bridge	Yes	Yes	Yes	
ELAD FDM-S1		Pre-built		20 kHz – 30 MHz, up to 200 MHz in undersampling	192 – 3072 kHz	14	N/A	No	61.44 MHz		1/4	USB	Yes	No	No	Xilinx
ELAD FDM-S2		Pre-built		HF:9 kHz – 52 MHz / FM:74 MHz - 108 MHz / VHF:135 MHz - 160 MHz	192 kHz – 6 MHz	16	N/A	No	122.88 MHz		1/8	USB 2.0	Yes	No	No	Xilinx Spartan-6
ELAD FDM-S3		Pre-built		9 kHz – 500 MHz	192 kHz – 24.576 MHz	16	N/A	No	122.88 MHz/98.304 MHz			USB 3.0	Yes	No	No	?
ELAD FDM-DUO		Pre-built		10 kHz – 54 MHz (experimental up to 165 MHz)	192 kHz – 6 MHz	16	?	Yes	122.88 MHz		1/8+1	Embedded system + 3x USB 2.0	Yes	No	No	Xilinx Spartan-6
Elecraft KX3		Pre-built or kit		0.5 – 54 MHz (144–148 MHz optional)		14	?	Yes	30 kHz?		0/1	USB or embedded system (no computer needed)	Yes	Yes	Yes	
FiFi-SDR		Pre-built		200 kHz – 30 MHz		?		No	96 kHz (integrated soundcard)		0/1	USB	Yes	Yes	?	
FLEX-6700		Pre-built		0.01 – 73, 135 – 165 MHz	24–192 kHz RX (x8), 14 MHz Display (x8)	16	16	Yes 100 W	245.76 MSPS		8/8	Gigabit Ethernet	Yes	Yes	Yes	Xilinx XC6VLX130T
CDRX-3200		Pre-built		0.01 – 100 MHz	48 – 250 kHz RX (x32)	24	—	No	48-250 kSPS		0/32, coherent or independent	Gigabit Ethernet	Yes through API	Yes through API	Yes through API	Xilinx XC5VLX30T
LBRX-24		Pre-built		950 – 2150 MHz	150 kHz – 80 MHz (x24)	16	—	No	150 kSPS – 80 MSPS		0/24	10 Gigabit Ethernet (x4)	Yes through API	Yes through API	Yes through API	Xilinx XC6VHX380T (x2)
ML-9600 with MIL-STD-188-110D data to 24 kHz		Pre-built		0.01 – 54 MHz	24 – 3072 kHz RX (x4), 14 MHz Display (x4)	16	16	Yes	245.76 MSPS	5x10^-13 (with GPSDO)	4/4	Gigabit Ethernet	Yes	Yes	Yes	Xilinx XC7A200T-2
ML-9600W with MIL-STD-188-110D data to 48 kHz		Pre-built		0.01 – 54 MHz	24 – 3072 kHz RX (x4), 14 MHz Display (x4)	16	16	Yes	245.76 MSPS	5x10^-13 (with GPSDO)	4/4	Gigabit Ethernet	Yes	Yes	Yes	Xilinx XC7A200T-2
FLEX-6700R		Pre-built		0.01 – 73, 135 – 165 MHz	24 – 192 kHz RX (x8), 14 MHz Display (x8)	16		No	245.76 MSPS (receiver)	5x10^-13 (with GPSDO)	8/8	Gigabit Ethernet	Yes	Yes	Yes	Xilinx XC6VLX130T
FLEX-6600M		Pre-built		0.01 – 54 MHz	24 – 192 kHz RX (x4), 14 MHz Display (x4)	16	16	Yes 100 W	245.76 MSPS	5x10^-13 (with GPSDO)	4/4	Gigabit Ethernet	Yes	Yes	Yes	Xilinx XC6VLX130T or XC7A200T
FLEX-6600		Pre-built		0.01 – 54 MHz	24 – 192 kHz RX (x4), 14 MHz Display (x4)	16	16	Yes 100 W	245.76 MSPS	5x10^-13 (with GPSDO)	4/4	Gigabit Ethernet	Yes	Yes	Yes	Xilinx XC6VLX130T or XC7A200T
FLEX-6500		Pre-built		0.01 – 73 MHz	24 – 192 kHz RX (x4), 14 MHz Display (x4)	16	16	Yes 100 W	245.76 MSPS	5x10^-13 (with GPSDO)	4/4	Gigabit Ethernet	Yes	Yes	Yes	Xilinx XC6VLX75T
FLEX-6400M		Pre-built		0.01 – 54 MHz	24 – 192 kHz RX (x2), 7 MHz Display (x2)	16	16	Yes 100 W	122.88 MSPS	5x10^-13 (with GPSDO)	2/2	Gigabit Ethernet	Yes	Yes	Yes	Xilinx XC6VLX75T or XC7A200T
FLEX-6400		Pre-built		0.01 – 54 MHz	24 – 192 kHz RX (x2), 7 MHz Display (x2)	16	16	Yes 100 W	122.88 MSPS	5x10^-13 (with GPSDO)	2/2	Gigabit Ethernet	Yes	Yes	Yes	Xilinx XC6VLX75T or XC7A200T
FLEX-6300		Pre-built		0.01 – 54 MHz	24 – 192 kHz RX (x2), 14 MHz Display (x2)	16	16	Yes 100 W	122.88 MSPS		2/2	Gigabit Ethernet	Yes	Yes	Yes	—
FLEX-5000A		Pre-built		0.01 – 65 MHz	48 – 192 kHz (x2)	24	24	Yes 100 W	48, 96, 192 kHz		2/2	1394a Firewire	Yes	No	No	—
FLEX-3000		Pre-built		0.01 – 65 MHz	48 – 96 kHz	24	24	Yes 100 W	48, 96 kHz		1/1	1394a Firewire	Yes	No	No	—
FLEX-1500		Pre-built		0.01 – 54 MHz	48 kHz	16	16	Yes 5 W	48 kHz		1/1	USB	Yes	No	No	—
FreeSRP		Pre-built (OSHW)		70 – 6000 MHz	61.44 MHz	12	?	Yes	61.44 Msps		1/1	USB 3.0	?	?	?	
FUNcube Dongle		Pre-built		64 – 1700 MHz		16		No	96 kHz		0/1	USB	Yes	Yes	Yes	
FUNcube Dongle Pro+		Pre-built		0.15 – 240 MHz, 420 – 1900 MHz		16		No	192 kHz		0/1	USB	Yes	Yes	Yes	
HackRF One	308,98 EUR	Pre-built		1 MHz – 6 GHz	20 MHz	8	8	Yes	8 – 20 Msps	20	0/1	USB 2.0	Yes	Yes	Yes	
HackRF Pro	434,98 EUR	Pre-built		100 kHz – 7.1 GHz	20 MHz	8	8	Yes	4 – 40 Msps	20	0/1	USB 2.0 Type-C	Yes	Yes	Yes	
Hermes-Lite2 (build9)		experimental kit		0 to 38.4 MHz	1.536 MHz	12 bits @ 76.8 MHz	12 bits @ 153.6 MHz	Yes	76.8 MSPS	0.5 ppm	4 / 4 + 1	Ethernet	Yes	Yes	Yes	Altera Cyclone IV
HiQSDR		prebuilt modules & kits, pcbs		30 kHz – 62 MHz		?			48 – 960 kHz		?	10/100 Ethernet	Yes	Yes	Yes	
HobbyPCB RS-HFIQ		Pre-built		3 MHz – 30 MHz	Up to 250 kHz depending on Sound Card	?	?	Yes 5 W	Depends on Sound Card		2/1 Using HDSDR software	Relies on a computing asset with sound device to process I and Q input and output	Yes, HDSDR, PowerSDR	Yes, Quisk, Linrad, GNU Radio	Yes, various software	
Hunter SDR		Kit		2.5 – 30 MHz (1 – 30 MHz typ.)		ext			External ADC required (I/Q output)		?	USB	Yes	No	No	
Icom IC-7610		Pre-built		RX: 0.030 - 60 MHz. TX: differs between regional models.		16	14	Yes	130 MHz		2/2	USB 2.0; Ethernet				
Iris-030		Pre-built		50 MHz – 3.8 GHz	122.88 MHz	12	12	Yes	122.88 Msps (SISO) 61.44 Msps (MIMO)		2/2	Gigabit Ethernet or 24.6 Gbit/s High-Speed Bus	Yes	Yes	Yes	Xilinx Zynq 7030
ISDB-T 2035/2037		Pre-built		50 – 960 MHz	8 MHz	?		No	0.5-12 MS/s		0/1	USB	Yes	Yes	Yes	
Kanga Finningley		Kit		3.750 MHz ± 48 kHz		ext		No	External ADC required (I/Q output)		?	None	Yes	Yes	Yes	
KerberosSDR (4x coherent RTL-SDR's)		Pre-built		24 MHz - 1.7 GHz	4 times the sample rate	8		No	2.4 Msps (can go up to 3.2 Msps but drops samples)	<1ppm	4/4	USB	Yes	Yes	Yes	
LimeSDR		Pre-built (full Open Source/Hardware)		100 kHz – 3.8 GHz	61.44 MHz (120 MHz internally)	12	?	Yes	61.44 Msps	2.5	2/2	USB 3.0, PCIe	Yes	Yes	Yes	Altera Cyclone IV
LimeSDR Mini		Pre-built (full Open Source/Hardware)		10 MHz – 3.5 GHz	30.72 MHz	12	?	Yes	30.72 Msps	2.5	1/1	USB 3.0, PCIe	Yes	Yes	Yes	Altera MAX 10
LimeSDR Mini 2.0		Pre-built (full Open Source/Hardware)		10 MHz – 3.5 GHz	30.72 MHz	12	?	Yes	30.72 Msps	2.5	1/1	USB 3.0, PCIe	Yes	Yes	Yes	Lattice ECP5
LD-1B		Pre-built		100 kHz – 30 MHz		ext			External ADC required (I/Q output)		?	USB	Yes	?	?	
Lunaris-SDR		Pre-built		10 kHz – 55 MHz		?		Yes	122.88 Msps		0/4	Gigabit Ethernet	Yes	Yes	Yes	
Matchstiq		Pre-built		300 MHz – 3.8 GHz		?	?		40 MSPS (RX/TX)		?	Embedded System or USB	Yes	Yes	Yes	Xilinx Spartan 6
MB1		Pre-built		10 kHz – 160 MHz	38 – 312 kHz	16	14	Yes	160 MSPS (RX), 640 MSPS (TX)		3/4	10/100 Ethernet, WLAN (optional)	Yes	Yes	?	
Mercury		Pre-built		0.1 – 55 MHz		16			122.88 MSPS		0/7	USB (via Ozy) or Ethernet (via Metis)	Yes	Yes	Yes	
Myriad-RF 1		Pre-built		300 MHz – 3.8 GHz		?			Programmable (16 selections); 0.75 – 14 MHz, Bypass mode		1/1	standard connector FX10A-80P	Yes	Yes	Yes	none
NooElec NESDR SMArt		Pre-built		25 – 1750 MHz	2.4 MHz nominal, and 3.2 MHz max.	8	NA	No	480 MSPS without dropping any samples	0.5 ppm		USB 2.0	Yes	Yes	Yes	None
NetSDR		PnP		0.1 kHz – 34 MHz		?		No	80.0 MHz		0/1 ?	Ethernet	Yes	Yes	Yes	
Noctar		Pre-built PCIe card		100 kHz – 4 GHz	200 MHz	?			?		?	PCI Express ×4	No	Yes	No	
Odyssey TRX		Pre-built		0.5 – 55 MHz		?		Yes	122.880 MSps ADC sampling, 48k-960k output samplrate		2/2	LAN, WiFi, USB	Yes	Yes	Yes	Altera Cyclone IV
Perseus		Pre-built		10 kHz – 40 MHz (87.5–108 MHz using FM down-converter)	1.6 MHz	16		No	80 MS/s (16 bit ADC)		?	USB 2.0	Yes	Yes	?	
Pappradio		Pre-built		150 kHz – 30 MHz (210 MHz using harmonics)		ext			External ADC required (I/Q output)		?	USB	Yes	Yes	?	
PCIe SDR MIMO 2x2		Pre-built		70 MHz – 6 GHz		?			61.44 Msps		2/2	PCIe (1x)	No	Yes	No	
PM-SDR		Pre-built		100 kHz – 50 MHz (up to 165 MHz using harmonics)	192 kHz	ext		No	External ADC required (I/Q output)		?	USB	Yes	Yes	?	
PrecisionWave Embedded SDR		Pre-built / Customizable Frontends		1 MHz – 9.7 GHz (depending on frontend)	2x RX: 155 MHz 2x TX: 650 MHz 2x2 MIMO Audio: up to 320 kbit/s	?		Yes	310 MSPS		2	Embedded System Gigabit Ethernet / USB / JTAG / Audio	Yes	Yes	Yes	Xilinx Zynq Z-7030
QS1R		Pre-built		10 kHz – 62.5 MHz (up to 500 MHz using images/alias)		16		No	125 MHz		1/2-4	USB	Yes	Yes	Yes	Altera Cyclone III
Quadrus (DRU-244A and SRM-3000)		Pre-built		0.1 – 440 MHz		?		No	80 MSps ADC sampling, 48k-1.536M output samplrate		0/16	PCI	Yes	Yes	Yes	
Radioberry		experimental kit		0 to 38.4 MHz	4x RX 48K	12 bits @ 76.8 MHz		Yes	76.8 MSPS			Ethernet	Yes	Yes	Yes	Altera Cyclone 10LP
Realtek RTL2832U DVB-T tuner		Pre-built with custom driver		24 – 1766 MHz (R820T tuner) (sensitivity drops off considerably outside this range, but can go 0–2,200 MHz (E4000 tuner with direct sampling mod) )	Matches sampling rate, but with filter roll-off	8		No	2.8 MHz (can go up to 3.2 MHz but drops samples)		?	USB	Yes	Yes	Yes	
Red Pitaya SDRlab122-16		Pre-built		2 RX + 2TX 300 kHz - 60 MHz (500 MHz bw with undersampling)	500 MHz	16 bit @ 122MSPS	14 bit @ 122MSPS	Yes	122.88 MSPS	up to 12		Gbit Ethernet and optional WiFi	Yes	Yes	Yes	Xilinx Zynq Z-7020
RDP-100		Pre-built		RX, 0 – 125 MHz; TX, 0–200 MHz		?		Yes	RX: 250 MSPS TX - 800 MSPS		?	Embedded System	No	No	No	
RTL-SDR V3 Receiver Dongle (hardware modded R820T2/RTL2838U DVB-T Tuner Dongles)		Pre-built and pre-modded with custom driver		0.5 – 1766 MHz (mod: RTL2832U Q-branch pins soldered to antenna port)	Matches sampling rate, but with filter roll-off	8		No	2.4 MHz (can go up to 3.2 MHz but drops samples)	1	?	USB	Yes	Yes	Yes	
SDRplay: RSP1A		Pre-built		1 kHz – 2 GHz	10 MHz	14<2 MHz 12<8 MHz 10<9.216 MHz 8>9.216 MHz		No	20 MSPS with 11 built-in preselection filters	0.5	1/1	USB 2.0	Yes	Yes	Yes	none
SDRplay: RSP1B		Pre-built		1 kHz – 2 GHz	10 MHz	14<2 MHz 12<8 MHz 10<9.216 MHz 8>9.216 MHz		No	20 MSPS with 11 built-in preselection filters	0.5	1/1	USB 2.0	Yes	Yes	Yes	none
SDRplay: RSPdx		Pre-built		1 kHz – 2 GHz	10 MHz	14<2 MHz 12<8 MHz 10<9.216 MHz 8>9.216 MHz		No	20 MSPS with 12 built-in preselection filters and 3 antenna ports	0.5	1/1	USB 2.0	Yes	Yes	Yes	none
SDRplay: RSPduo		Pre-built		1 kHz – 2 GHz	10 MHz	14<2 MHz 12<8 MHz 10<9.216 MHz 8>9.216 MHz		No	Two independent tuners, each with 11 built-in preselection filters. 3 antenna ports	0.5	2/2	USB 2.0	Yes	Yes	Yes	none
Soft66AD / Soft66ADD / Soft66LC4 / Soft66RTL		Pre-built		0.5 – 70 MHz		ext		No	External ADC required (I/Q output)		0/1	USB	Yes	Unofficially	?	
SDR-IQ		PnP		0.1 kHz – 30 MHz		?			66.666 MHz		1/1 ?	USB	Yes	Yes	Yes	
SDR-IP		PnP		0.1 kHz – 34 MHz		?			80.0 MHz		1/1 ?	Ethernet	Yes	Yes	Yes	
SDR-LAB SDR04		Pre-built		0.4 – 4 GHz		?			40 MHz		?	USB 3.0 SuperSpeed	Yes	Yes	Yes	
SDRX01B		Pre-built and kit option		50 kHz – 200 MHz		ext		No	< 2 MHz External ADC required (I/Q output)		0/1 - Scalable (multiple receiver can be connected to the same LO)	Ethernet or USB usually, but other interfaces are available in MLAB modular system	Yes	Yes	Yes	
SDR Minor		Pre-built		0.1 – 55 MHz		?		No	122.880 MSps ADC sampling, 48k-960k output samplrate		1/1	LAN 10/100	Yes	Yes	No	
SDR-1		Kit and pre-built		530 kHz – 30 MHz		?			up to 192 kHz depending on soundcard		0/1	USB	Yes	No	No	
SDRstick UDPSDR-HF2		Pre-built		0.1 – 55 MHz		?			122.88 Msps		0/1	1G Ethernet via BeMicroCV-A9	Yes	Yes	Yes	Altera (as an add-on)
SDRstick UDPSDR-HF1Please Note: A functional receiver requires both the UDPSDR-HF1 and a BeMicro SDK FPGA development board		Pre-built		0.1 – 30 MHz		?		No	80 Msps		0/1	1G Ethernet via BeMicroCV-A9	Yes	Yes	Yes	Altera (as an add-on)
SDR MK1.5 'Andrus'		Pre-built, Open Source Design		5 kHz – 31 MHz (1.7 GHz downconverter opt.)		?		No	64 MSPS		?	USB 2.0, 10/100 Ethernet	Yes	Yes	Yes	
SDR-4+		Pre-built		0.85 – 70.5 MHz		?		No	48 kHz (integrated soundcard)		1/1	USB × 2	Yes	Yes	Yes	
SDR(X) HF, VHF & UHF		Pre-built		0.1 – 1850 MHz (R820T tuner)		?		No	Optimized for HF amateur bands with 4 user selectable pre-select HF filters		?	USB	Yes	Yes	Yes	
SignalShark		Pre-built		8 kHz - 8 GHz	40 MHz	16	N/A	No	?	< 1	?	Gigabit Ethernet	Yes	?	?	?
SoftRock-40		Kit		7.5 MHz		ext		No	48 kHz		0/1	USB	Yes	Yes	Yes	
SoftRock Lite II		Kit		1.891 – 1.795 MHz, 3.57 – 3.474 MHz, 7.104 – 7.008 MHz, 10.173 – 10.077 MHz, 14.095 – 13.999 MHz (also purchasable in other tunings)		ext		No	96 kHz		0/1	USB	Yes	Yes	Yes	
SoftRock RX Ensemble II LF		Kit or Pre-built		180 kHz – 3.0 MHz		ext		No	External ADC required (I/Q output)		0/1	USB	Yes	Yes	Yes	
SoftRock RX Ensemble II HF		Kit or Pre-built		1.8 – 30 MHz		ext		No	External ADC required (I/Q output)		0/1	USB	Yes	Yes	Yes	
SoftRock RX Ensemble RXTX		Kit or Pre-built		Choose either 160m, 80m/40m, 40m/30m/20m, 30m/20m/17m, or 15m/12m/10m ("complete [rx/tx] frequency agility within the [chosen] 'superband'")		?		Yes	External ADC required (I/Q output)			USB	Yes	Yes	Yes	
Spectre		Pre-built		0.4 – 4 GHz	200 MHz	16		Yes	310 MSPS			USB, Serial, jtag, 10 Gbit/s SFP+ Ethernet	Yes	Yes	Yes	
SunSDR2 Pro		Pre-built		10 kHz – 160 MHz	38 – 312 kHz	16	14	Yes	160 MSPS (RX), 640 MSPS (TX)		3/4	10/100 Ethernet, WLAN (embedded)	Yes	Yes	Yes	
ThinkRF WSA5000		Pre-built		50 MHz – 8 GHz, 18 GHz or 27 GHz		Up to 100 MHz		No	125 MSPS		?	10/100/1000 Ethernet	Yes	Yes	Yes	
UHFSDR		Kit		1.75 – 700 MHz Tx/Rx		ext		Yes	External soundcard required (I/Q input/output)		?	LPT parallel port or USB/W QRP2000/UBW/UBW32	N\A	N\A	N\A	
USRP B200		Pre-built		70 MHz – 6 GHz	56 MHz	12	12	Yes	56 Msps			USB 3.0	Yes	Yes	Yes	Xilinx Spartan 6 XC6SLX75
USRP B210		Pre-built		70 MHz – 6 GHz	56 MHz	12	12	Yes	56 Msps			USB 3.0	Yes	Yes	Yes	Xilinx Spartan 6 XC6SLX150
USRP N200		Pre-built		DC – 6 GHz	Up to 25 MHz (40 MHz b/w cards limited by GigE interface)	14	16	Yes	25 Msps for 16-bit samples; 50 Msps for 8-bit samples	0.5 ppm TCXO. 0.01 ppm w/ GPSDO Option		Gigabit Ethernet	Yes	Yes	Yes	Xilinx Spartan 3A-DSP 1800
USRP N210		Pre-built		DC – 6 GHz	Up to 25 MHz (40 MHz b/w cards limited by GigE interface)	14	16	Yes	25 Msps for 16-bit samples; 50 Msps for 8-bit samples	0.5 ppm TCXO. 0.01 ppm w/ GPSDO Option		Gigabit Ethernet	Yes	Yes	Yes	Xilinx Spartan 3A-DSP 3400
USRP X300		Pre-built		DC – 6 GHz	Up to 320 MHz (2x TX/RX at 160 MHz each)	14	16	Yes	200 Msps	2.5 ppm GPSDO Option 20 ppb (GPS unlocked)		Gigabit Ethernet, 10 Gigabit Ethernet, PCIe	Yes	Yes	Yes	Xilinx Kintex-7 XC7K325T
USRP X310		Pre-built		DC – 6 GHz	Up to 320 MHz (2x TX/RX at 160 MHz each)	14	16	Yes	200 Msps	2.5 ppm GPSDO Option 20 ppb (GPS unlocked)		Gigabit Ethernet, 10 Gigabit Ethernet, PCIe	Yes	Yes	Yes	Xilinx Kintex-7 XC7K410T
UmTRX		Pre-built		300 MHz – 3.8 GHz	Up to 28 MHz	12	12	Yes	13 MSPS x2	0.1; 0.01 with GPS lock	?	Gigabit Ethernet	Yes	Yes	?	Spartan 6 LX75
WARPv3		Pre-built		2.4 GHz and 5.8 GHz	40 MHz	12	12	Yes	40 Msps		1/2	Dual Gigabit Ethernet	Yes	Yes	Yes	Xilinx Virtex-6 LX240T
WinRadio WR-G31DCC		Pre-built		9 kHz – 50 MHz		?	N/A	No	100 MSPS		3/3	USB	Yes	No	No	
X-RAD		Pre-built		RX: 950–1450 MHz TX: 875–1525 MHz		?		Yes	RX: 1.6 GSPS TX: 3.2 GSPS		?	PCIe	Yes	No	No	
Xiegu G90		Pre-built		RX: 0.5 - 30 MHz TX: all amateur bands 1.8 - 30 MHz	48 kHz	24		Yes 20 W	±24k bandwidth spectrum display with waterfall	10	1/1	Embedded system (no computer needed), I/Q output for interfacing with a PC or XDT1 panadapter	Yes	Yes	Yes	
XTRX Pro		Pre-built		30 – 3700 MHz	120 MHz	12	12	Yes	120 MSRP SISO, 90 MSRP MIMO	0.1; 0.01 with GPS lock		mini PCIe	Unknown	Yes	Unknown	Xilinx Artix7 50T
Zeus ZS-1		Pre-built		300 kHz – 30 MHz		?		Yes	10 kHz, 20 kHz, 40 kHz, 100 kHz		1/3	USB 2.0	Yes	No	No	
USRP N310		Pre-built		10 MHz – 6 GHz	100 MHz	16	14	Yes	122.88, 125, and 153.6 MS/s	0.1 ppm		SFP+/ Gigabit Ethernet	Yes	Yes	Yes	Xilinx Zynq 7100

== See also ==
- List of communications receivers
