= Eric Blossom =

Founder of GNU Radio project

Eric Blossom is the founder of the GNU Radio project. GNU Radio is a free software toolkit for building software-defined radio and signal processing systems. His intention has been to build decentralized communication, moving away from infrastructure-based systems. One-way channels provided by broadcast radio and TV are heavily regulated, so there is a need for strategies that free content from being controlled by a small handful of powerful organizations, helping to liberate the user's interests rather than the operators'.

Prior to his involvement with software radio, Blossom worked in the secure phone business, becoming the co-founder and CTO of Starium Ltd., where he oversaw the design and development of a line of cryptographic equipment for the commercial marketplace. He is also the founder of an international consulting company called Blossom Research. Blossom practices yoga and jujitsu.
