= Newcastle Permanent =

Australian financial institution

- Type: Private
- Industry: Banking and financial services
- Founded: 2 February 1903 (as Newcastle District Starr-Bowkett Society); 1939 (as Newcastle Cooperative Building and Investment Society Limited)
- Headquarters: Newcastle, New South Wales, Australia
- Products: Retail Banking
- Total assets: AUD $10.7 billion (2019)
- Parent: NGM Group
- Website: www.newcastlepermanent.com.au

Newcastle Permanent was an Australian building society, and is now a brand of Newcastle Greater Mutual Group, as a result of a merger with Greater Bank. Its head office is located in Newcastle, New South Wales, Australia.

== History ==
- 1903 – Founded as a Starr-Bowkett Society in the Newcastle suburb of Wickham on 2 February 1903
- 1939 – Newcastle Permanent Building Society was established
- 1966 – First branch was opened to customers
- 1970 – Introduced its famous ‘house’ logo
- 1983 – Relocation of office headquarters to King St, Newcastle
- 1984 – Installation of Newcastle Permanent's first ATM
- 2001 – Internet banking was launched for Newcastle Permanent customers
- 2004 – The Charitable Foundation distributed its first grant
- 2018 – Celebrated 115 years of banking.
- 2023 – Merged with Greater Bank

In November 2022, Newcastle Permanent's members voted to merge the society with Greater Bank, to take effect in March 2023, provided regulatory approval. Both brands were planned to continue.
