= NGM Group =

Newcastle Greater Mutual Group Ltd
- Trade name: NGM Group
- Type: Mutual (ADI)
- Industry: Banking, Financial services
- Predecessor: Newcastle Permanent Building Society; Greater Bank
- Founded: March 1, 2023; 3 years ago
- Headquarters: Newcastle, New South Wales, Australia
- Key people: Darren Turner (Chair); Rod Jackson (Deputy Chair); Bernadette Inglis (Managing Director & CEO)
- Net income: ▲ A$116.9 million (FY2025)
- Total assets: ▲ A$23.1 billion (FY2025)
- Total equity: A$2.0 billion (FY2025)
- Number of employees: 1,600+
- Website: www.ngmgroup.com.au

Newcastle Greater Mutual Group Ltd, trading as NGM Group, is an Australian customer-owned financial institution with its headquarters in Newcastle, New South Wales. It was formed on 1 March 2023 through the merger of Newcastle Permanent Building Society and Greater Bank, and operates as an Authorised Deposit-taking Institution (ADI) regulated by the Australian Prudential Regulation Authority (APRA).

NGM Group continues to operate the Greater Bank and Newcastle Permanent brands.

== History ==
In August 2021, the boards of Newcastle Permanent and Greater Bank announced a preliminary agreement to explore a merger of the two customer-owned institutions. The stated rationale included achieving economies of scale to support technology investment and regulatory compliance costs, while retaining regional customer-owned banking operations.

In November 2022, members of both mutuals voted in favour of the merger. After regulatory approvals from APRA and the Treasurer of Australia, the merger completed on 1 March 2023, forming Newcastle Greater Mutual Group Ltd. At completion, the group served more than 600,000 customers through branches in New South Wales and south-east Queensland.

== Operations and corporate structure ==
NGM Group operates as a mutual, in which depositors hold voting rights as members rather than as external shareholders. It provides retail banking products, including savings and transaction accounts, home loans, personal loans, credit cards, and business banking. Greater Bank and Newcastle Permanent continue to operate as separate brands, while the group consolidated its operations following the 2023 merger. In 2026, Newcastle Permanent reported a rise in home loan application volumes.

== Financial performance and funding ==
For the financial year ended 2025, NGM Group reported total assets of A$23.1 billion, net assets of A$2.0 billion, and net profit after tax of A$116.9 million. By the end of FY2025 it served more than 635,000 customers. During FY2025, the group reported technology investment of more than A$40 million, including the consolidation of 15 systems.

In January 2026, NGM Group completed a A$500 million five-year senior unsecured debt issuance, reported as the largest transaction of its tenor by an Australian mutual bank. The issue attracted orders of about A$1.14 billion from domestic and international investors.

== Governance and regulation ==
NGM Group is governed by a board of directors drawn from both legacy institutions. In January 2026, the group named Darren Turner as its incoming chair, succeeding Samantha Martin-Williams, who had been chair since 2024 and was the group's first female chair. Turner took up the role in March 2026. The group is regulated under the Banking Act 1959 (Cth) by APRA, ASIC, and AUSTRAC.
