= Starr-Bowkett Society =

The last known Starr-Bowkett Society, in Newtown, Australia, closed in 2024

A Starr-Bowkett Society was a co-operative, non-profit financial institution that provided interest-free loans to its members and operated on the principle of mutual self-help, as espoused in 1843 by Dr T. E. Bowkett. Originating in the UK and popular in Australia and New Zealand from the late 19th century until the early to mid 20th century, they no longer exist in any form.

== Origins ==
Dr. Thomas Edward Bowkett was a London surgeon, and a vocal proponent of a number of progressive and unionist ideas. His scheme to provide "mechanics" with a means to become landholders, and thus have a greater influence on government, was first proposed during a series of lectures and articles in 1843.

In 1862 Richard B. Starr made some changes to Dr. Bowkett's scheme, including a slightly increased subscription fee and shorter subscription time, among others. The changes made the scheme more palatable to potential subscribers and Starr promoted his now copyrighted system aggressively. The Starr changes also made running a Starr-Bowkett Society profitable for management.

=== Logistics of loans ===
A registered society was formed with a limited number of memberships available. New members were assigned a number and selected the amount of loan they wished to apply for. Members then paid a monthly subscription for a set time period - e.g. 200 months. The amount paid each month was based on the amount of the proposed loan, generally 0.25% of the loan.

Once the society had accumulated sufficient funds from subscriptions, ballot meetings began and were usually held on a monthly basis. Loan recipients were chosen by a lottery. Once a member received a loan they paid it back over time, along with any amount still owing on their original subscription commitment. Once all members had the opportunity to take out a loan, the society was closed and the original capital returned to its members.

== History ==
There were concerns over the lottery system involved in the scheme, which was not carried out in full view of all members and therefore open to physical abuse to change those who received the funds. That, and the actions of some unscrupulous society managers, led governments in the United Kingdom to outlaw Starr-Bowkett societies there. However, they had spread to the Australian colonies, and became a popular option for a burgeoning middle class to afford their own homes.

Some societies transformed over the years into mainstream banks (e.g. Newcastle Permanent of Newcastle, NSW, Australia), and many were closed in the 1960s due to unscrupulous operators. The last known traditional Starr-Bowkett society, in Newtown, NSW, Australia, sold its building in 2014 and moved operations to Strathfield. It was wound up in 2024 when the final loans were repaid.

As of 1 July 2019, no new Starr-Bowkett Societies may be formed or registered in NSW.
