= ABS Building Society =

Australian mutual building society

- Type: Building society
- Industry: Financial services
- Founded: 1970
- Founders: A group of businessmen led by Mr Alwyn W. Jones
- Defunct: 2011
- Fate: Merged
- Successor: Greater Bank
- Headquarters: Armidale, New South Wales, Australia
- Area served: New South Wales
- Key people: Roger Cracknell (Chief Executive)
- Products: Banking services, mortgages
- Website: www.absbuildingsociety.com.au

ABS Building Society Limited was an Australian mutual building society with its head office based in Armidale, New South Wales. ABS was a member of the industry body, Abacus, which represents Australian Credit Unions and building societies. ABS had an Australian Financial Services Licence providing financial services predominantly in the New England and North West regions of New South Wales, Australia. It offered financial products and services including savings accounts, term deposits, housing, commercial and personal loans and other services such as secure self-storage facilities, and delivery of Bank Statements through the Bank Link system.

In 2011, ABS Building Society merged with Newcastle based Greater Building Society (now Greater Bank) and continues to provide services to the region under the Greater brand. ABS had one branch in Armidale and an agency in Guyra, which have continued to operate since the merger.

== History ==
ABS Building Society Limited (ABS) was formed by a group of businessmen led by Armidale accountant Mr Alwyn W. Jones in 1970 to facilitate home ownership in the New England region by providing access to affordable loan funds. Mr Jones was the founding Chief Executive whose accounting firm, now known as Jones Cracknell & Starr, provided management services to ABS from its inception. Following Mr Jones' retirement, Mr Roger Cracknell was appointed Chief Executive in 1973, and held that role until the merger with Greater in 2011.

The executive management team at the time of the merger were: Roger Cracknell (Chief Executive), Rodney Rixon (Deputy Chief Executive) and Josie Bieber (chief financial officer). The Armidale Branch Manager was Rex Gream and the Customer Service Supervisor was Karen Tracey. The Operations Manager was Barry Tomkins and the Loans Manager was Wayne Wilby, who featured prominently in the ABS television marketing campaign "Where's Wayne."

The society was governed by a board of directors. The directors of ABS Building Society at the time of the merger were: Peter Hanlan (chairman), Richard Mills, Phillip Rose, Malcolm Treadgold, Lyndon Hardman, Patrick Hutchinson and Etoline Galbraith.

At the time of the merger, ABS had approximately $75 million in total assets, $11.5 million in total equity and approximately 3,500 members. ABS had 10 staff at its head office in Armidale and its service centre in Guyra.

== ABS merger ==
On 20 April 2011, 97% of ABS members voted in favour of the resolution to merge its operations with the Greater Building Society. The transfer of business took place on 1 May 2011. The ABS directors retired on this date as did Rodney Rixon who continued his role in the accountancy firm, Jones Cracknell & Starr. The former Chief Executive Roger Cracknell also retired and took a position on the Greater Board.
