= Nakagami =

Nakagami (written: 中上) is a Japanese surname. Notable people with the surname include:

- Akiko Nakagami (中上 晶子), Japanese therapist
- Kenji Nakagami (中上 健次) (1946–1992), Japanese writer, critic and poet
- Takaaki Nakagami (中上 貴晶) (born 1992), Japanese motorcycle racer

== See also ==
- Nakagami District, Okinawa
- Nakagami distribution, a statistical distribution
