= ABS network =

Broadcasting, media and news network in the Middle East

ABS
- Industry: Broadcast Services
- Founded: 1993; 33 years ago
- Headquarters: Amman
- Owner: Mohammad Al Ajlouni
- Website: ABS

The Arab Broadcasting Services network is a broadcasting, media and news provider network that has been operating in the Middle East for over 16 years.

It currently operates around the world in Jordan (the company headquarters is located in the capital city of Amman), Iraq (in both Baghdad and Erbil), the United States (in both New York and Washington), Dubai, Beirut, Cairo and Afghanistan.

== History ==
ABS Network was started by Jordanian media entrepreneur Mohammed Al-Ajlouni as a subsidy of his media company, Jordan Multimedia Productions (JMP). Aljouni, a former Middle East Operations' Manager for ABC, formed the broadcasting network to fill a perceived media niche in the Middle East. The network quickly earned the exclusive right to provide Uplink services to Jordan TV.

They've worked together with several major international news organizations, including Al Jazeera, BBC, and Reuters to cover major news stories such as the Gulf War, the Iraq War, and the Arab Spring.

Aljouni also operates news agency Arab 24.

== Services ==
- Satellite news gathering (SNG) and electronic news gathering (ENG) technology services.
- Full reporting facilities covering current events.
- 14 studio facilities.
- Retailer for film production and satellite broadcasting equipment.
- News Agency and an Archive source for the major events in the region.

== Clients ==
- Al Jazeera Network
- Al Jazeera International
- Al Jazeera Sports
- BBC Arabic
- Abu Dhabi TV
- Dubai TV
- Reuters
- CNBC
- Fox News
- Alhurra
