= Aerial base station =

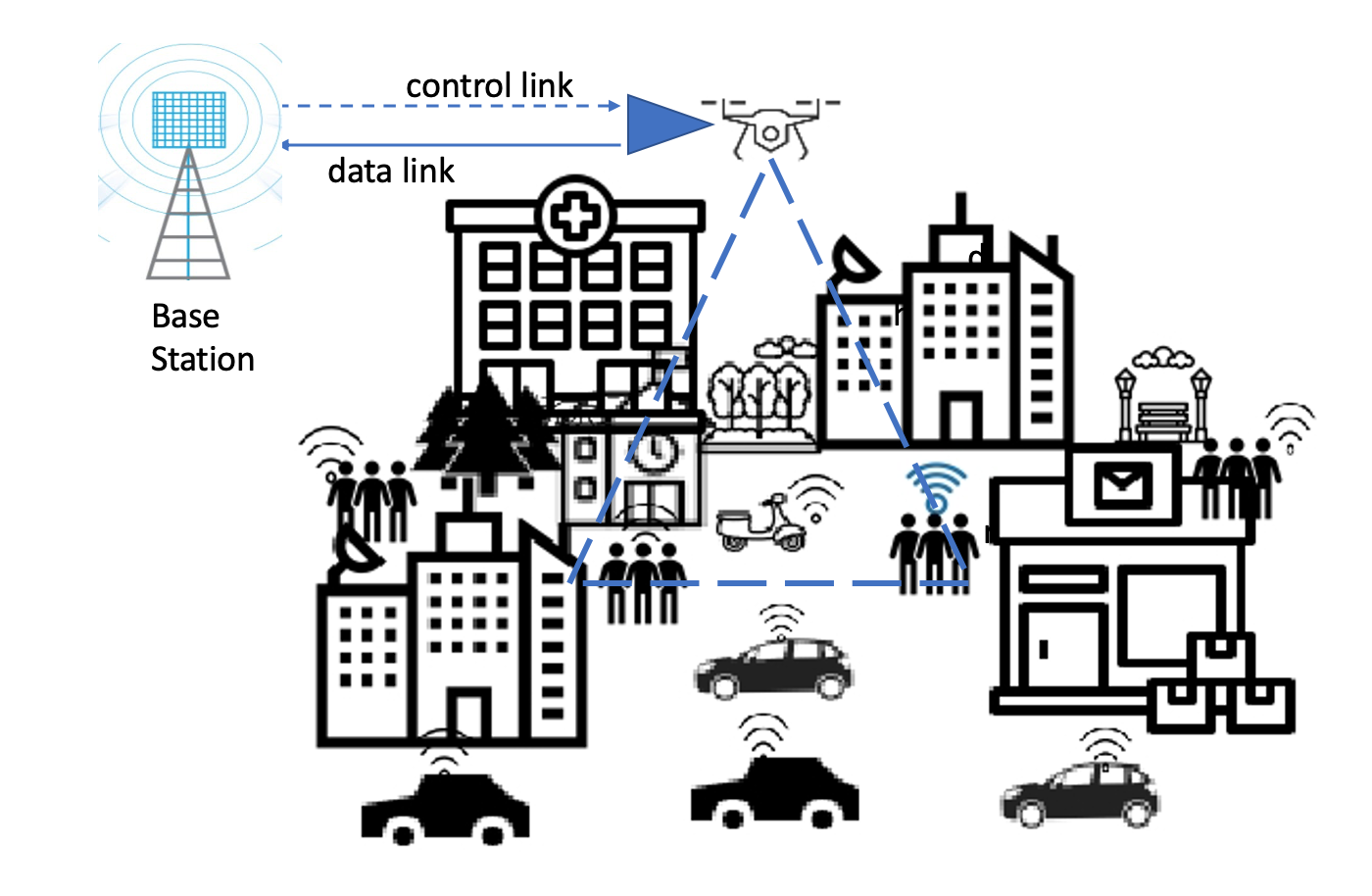
Network scenario with ABS deployment

An Aerial base station (ABS), also known as unmanned aerial vehicle (UAV)-mounted base station (BS), is a flying antenna system that works as a hub between the backhaul network and the access network. If more than one ABS is involved in such a relaying mechanism the so-called fly ad-hoc network (FANET) is established. FANETs are an aerial form of wireless ad hoc networks (WANET)s or mobile ad hoc networks (MANET)s.

To provide "connectivity from the sky" is one of the innovative aspects of the 5G network. A strategic difference of ABSs with respect to the static classical network architecture is their ability to deploy on-demand networks at specific locations, thanks to their in-built properties of mobility, flexibility in three-dimensional space, adaptive altitude, and symmetric rotation. These characteristics allow to offer to ground users premium services with high quality wireless links, poor degradation, high capacity and low interference.

From an industry point of view, different use cases have been planned for ABS network deployment in order to provide connectivity during temporary events and emergency situations, and in zones or rural areas without pre-existing solid network infrastructure.

== Unmanned aerial vehicles in wireless communications ==
UAV were born only for military aims. Thanks to the evolution of the manufacturing technology, nowadays, it is one of the candidate solutions to provide on-demand connectivity in 5G network systems.

=== History ===
UAVs, more commonly identified as drones, are small aircraft or balloons that can be controlled in a remote manner by a radio control/RF module or using intelligent on-board systems that make the drone autonomous, simply cooperating with the network infrastructure and without human interaction.

Historically, UAVs were only considered as expensive toys, thus, they were mainly used for military purposes such as cargo delivery, remote surveillance, armed attacks, and to reduce the soldiers losses in harsh territory since only a remote human pilot with a radiofrequency control was involved. The primitive use of a UAV was recorded at Venice in 1849 when the Austrians attacked Italy using unmanned balloons furnished with explosives. Applications of UAVs were also present during the first and second world wars.

Thanks to the advancement of on-board sensors and manufacturing technologies, in the second half of the twentieth century, UAVs were also used for espionage and hostage search using wireless sensors.

In the early 2000s, both the costs and the size reduced, thus, UAVs civilian and commercial applications started to be predominant, allowing a myriad of uses in the wireless communications field with the support of the existing network architecture, such as package delivery and traffic control in smart city context, or precision agriculture and terrain inspection in Industry 4.0. It is worth noting that in all these scenarios UAVs work as aerial user equipments (UEs), in coexistence with the classical ground users of the network, and not as an integrated part of the network infrastructure itself. Such a wireless technology is generally referred as cellular-connected UAVs. Amazon Air and Google’s project Wing initiatives are prominent examples of cellular-connected UAVs use cases.

In recent years, due to the continuous miniaturization of components of wireless communication apparatus, the idea of equipping UAVs with radio frequency transceivers and dedicated hardware, to provide reliable, cost-effective, and on-demand wireless links to users on the ground, has started to be a reality. Nowadays, It is possible to find transceivers with a weight less than 2 kilograms, such as universal software radio peripheral integrated with software-defined radio, which can be easily mounted on the aircraft using a 3D printed support.

The new concept of UAV-assisted wireless communications is a technology to support the fast-growing wireless data traffic. As a result of industry testing and academic research, ABSs are identified as an important component of 5G and beyond network.

=== Key and challenging aspects ===
The integration of ABSs or FANETs into wireless cellular networks as aerial communication platforms brings new network infrastructure design possibilities and challenging aspects to take into account. Indeed, there are many differences compared to the terrestrial counterpart.

- high altitude: the typical height of terrestrial BSs is around 10-20 meters in an urban scenario, whereas the current regulation allows the ABSs to hover up to 100-120 meters. This enables the ABS to achieve broader coverage compared to classical terrestrial infrastructure and reduce the interference from other terminals. In fact, the ground terminals can be easily discernible at different altitudes and elevation angles measured with respect to the ABS;
- 3D high mobility and user tracking: ABS can provide a higher line of sight (LoS) channel probability than classical ground-to-ground communications that generally suffer more path loss attenuation and fading effects. ABSs transceivers can track the moving users (pedestrian, connected vehicles or Internet of things devices) maintaining a stable LoS connection. There are several advantages of such condition. For instance, in 5G networks, millimeter-waves are employed and LoS is vital for providing connectivity at these frequency bandwidths. Moreover, LoS condition enables effective beamforming in the 3D space, making ABSs suitable candidates for the so-called 3D MIMO;
- FANETs are scalable networks where the number of involved ABSs can be changed dynamically and based on use-case. Usually information among ABSs in FANETs is exchanged using the 802.11p protocol used for vehicular communications. The term ad-hoc refers to the fact that FANETs are characterized by a decentralized routing protocol for data information transmission;
- energy-efficient design: ABSs, and UAVs in general, are really energy limited systems; this aspect poses critical bounds on their hovering and flight time, and some trade off can arise in terms of quality of services provided to user (i.e. transmitted power) and energy constrains;
- security and surrounding environment health: the ABSs and their sensors need to be continually monitored to avoid incidents and maintain safety distance with others aerial vehicles, buildings, and obstacles. For this purpose, a control link is established with the terrestrial backhaul network;
- privacy and data protection: the information collected by the on-board sensors are an issue in terms of both individuals and businesses privacy.

=== Impact and applications scenarios ===
ABSs allow a mobile operator/connectivity provider or network designers to create on demand networks in a bordered area that cater to particular clients and use cases. Lightweight, Commercial BSs are suitable to be mounted on UAVs with a moderate payload allowing a wide range of applications:

- effectively accompaniment existing terrestrial systems in crowded areas (e.g., stadium during a sport event or live performances) by providing additional capacity;
- information dissemination and collection in wireless sensor networks and IoT scenarios (smart city or in fields for terrain inspection and precision agriculture) where, due to low transmitted power of the devices, long range communications are not possible;
- information transmission among geographically separated data centres or delivering network coverage in hard to reach rural or suburban areas, where deploying ABSs becomes highly advantageous compared to expensive telecommunications towers for BS or fiber links installation;
- fast connectivity restoration after infrastructure failure or data relaying in emergency situations such as terroristic attacks. An example is the link between the frontline and the headquarters during such unpredictable situations;

Models of such an innovative technology are provided by Qualcomm and AT&T that have experimented the deployment of ABSs for enabling wide-scale wireless communications. Also, projects such as Facebook Aquila, cell-on-wheels and wings (COW-W), Google SKYBENDER, Nokia F-Cell, Huawei Digital Sky are aimed for testing the benefits of ABS services.

== Regulations ==
One of the significant barriers of ABSs wireless communication technology is the absence of unique legal regulation. Policy differs among countries and zones.

The regulations criteria can be split into two categories, the first related to UAV technology and the second related to telecommunications.

Concerning UAVs, there are different agencies that develop guidelines for flight control. In the United States, operations are controlled by the Federal Aviation Administration (FAA) and National Aeronautics and Space Administration (NASA). In Europe, the European Aviation Safety Agency (EASA) has published the regulation on the use of UAV. The International Civil Aviation Organization (ICAO) is concerned with the Asia guideline for the regulation and safe operation of unmanned aircraft systems.

Wireless communication regulations are being continuously developed by different organizations, such as the Electronic Communications Committee (ECC) in Europe and the Federal Communications Commission (FCC) in the United States. The aim is to control the operations of ABS considering various factors such as ABS type and identification, frequency spectrum for data sharing and sensors control, altitude that depends on the presence of line of sight with the pilot, speed and weight.

== Architectures overview ==
Although 3GPP is still concentrating its efforts on cellular-connected UAVs standardization, there are different proposed wireless architectures that involve flying systems carrying an intelligent router. The architecture involving ABSs is generally characterized by two basic types of communication links: the control and non-payload communications (CNPC) link and the data link.

=== Control and non-payload communications link ===
Control and non-payload communications link involves communications between the ABSs and ground control centres of the backhaul network that it is generally a specialized BS. CNPC link has mainly safety-critical functions, such as real-time control and obstacle collision avoidance. For this purpose, it needs more stringent latency and security requirements. Security and privacy are also prioritized to avoid unauthorized controllers. The CNPC link is also used for delivering information about the network configuration, which determines time and frequency resource allocation, and to collect some information about the ABSs's flight data (such as GPS, relative elevation angle, and flight speed), residual energy, and performances about the provide connectivity (such as average bit error rate, received and transmitted power). The frequency bandwidths allocated for this link are L-bands and C-bands since they do not suffer severe path loss, allowing a high reliability and low delay communications.

=== Data link ===
The data links involve the transmission of information data among mobile ground devices, terrestrial infrastructure (BS or gateway), sensors, and others ABSs. Since its scope is different compared to the CNPC, the requirements also vary. The data link is less delay-sensitive than the CNPC link, while the capacity request is generally application dependent. The data rate can range from kilobits per second in case of ABSs-ground users link, so that the 4G frequency bandwidth can be adopted, up to gigabits per second in case of ABS-backhaul network or ABS-ABS communications. Since these latter are mainly dominated by LoS component, the utilization of millimeter-wave bandwidth is a prominent solution for guaranteeing the high capacity requirement.

== Placement considerations ==
The problem of finding an optimum location and/or path planning is more challenging for ABSs compared to the conventional terrestrial BSs. On one hand ABSs can freely move in 3D space without any borders, on the other hand, there are also variety of applied constraints that need to be considered, e.g., maintain LoS connectivity, energy limitation, and obstacles collision avoidance, many of which are time dependent and are difficult to predict.

In most of the cases, the optimal solution is application-based. For instance, in case of cellular coverage ABSs-supported, the solution is to deploy static ABS that hovers above the centre of the area to be covered. In case of real time applications or moving devices, it is more intuitive to employ more than one ABSs to cooperatively achieve low delay and high reliability communications. Also in case of energy-aware deployment several ABSs need to cooperate letting the ABS to leave the serving area for energy replenishment, meanwhile the connectivity gap is filled by neighbouring ABSs, for example, via increasing the transmission power and/or adjusting the aircraft positions.

== See also ==
- 5G
- UAV
- List of unmanned aerial vehicle applications
- Regulation of unmanned aerial vehicles
- History of unmanned aerial vehicles
- MANET
- millimeter-wave
- access network
- Universal Software Radio Peripheral
