= Cis-abienol synthase =

Enzyme

cis-abienol synthase

Identifiers
- EC no.: 4.2.3.140

Databases
- IntEnz: IntEnz view
- BRENDA: BRENDA entry
- ExPASy: NiceZyme view
- KEGG: KEGG entry
- MetaCyc: metabolic pathway
- PRIAM: profile
- PDB structures: RCSB PDB PDBe PDBsum
Search
- PMC: articles
- PubMed: articles
- NCBI: proteins

cis-Abienol synthase (EC 4.2.3.140, Z-abienol synthase, CAS, ABS) is an enzyme with systematic name (13E)-8α-hydroxylabd-13-en-15-yl-diphosphate-lyase (cis-abienol forming). This enzyme catalyses the following chemical reaction

(13E)-8α-hydroxylabd-13-en-15-yl diphosphate $\rightleftharpoons$ cis-abienol + diphosphate

This enzyme is isolated from the plants Abies balsamea (balsam fir) and Nicotiana tabacum (tobacco).
