= Ankaferd BloodStopper =

logo

Ankaferd BloodStopper (ABS) is a product claimed to have antihemorrhagic properties. It is used in hospitals and ambulances in Turkey to stop bleeding occurring from external bodily injuries and operations. It is the first Turkish medical product officially accredited by the Turkish Ministry of Health.

Hüseyin Cahit Fırat, the developer of ABS, is a Turkish entrepreneur. He is not a doctor of medicine, as his background of study lies in economics, with some contributions in the fields of business and journalism. Firat's interest in herbology led him to the discovery of ABS, which consists entirely of plant-based ingredients.

The final product was attested and finished in the hematology faculty of Hacettepe University in Ankara.

== Features ==
ABS consists of 100% herbal ingredients and contains no synthetic additives. It is made from five plants: Thymus vulgaris, Glycyrrhiza glabra, Vitis vinifera, Alpinia officinarum and Urtica dioica.
