= Abs (surname) =

Abs is a German surname. Notable people with the surname include:

- Hermann Josef Abs (1901–1994), German banker
- Johann Christian Josef Abs (1781–1823), German educator
- Carl Abs (1851–1895), German sportsman
