= GNU Radio =

Block programming software for radio

- Original author: Eric Blossom
- Developers: GNU Radio Community; President: Josh Morman; Maintainer: Marcus Müller
- Release: 2001; 25 years ago
- Stable release: 3.10.12.0 / 20 February 2025
- Written in: C++, Python
- Operating system: Cross-platform
- Available in: English
- Type: Radio
- License: 2007: GPL-3.0-or-later; 2001: GPL-2.0-or-later
- Website: www.gnuradio.org
- Repository: github.com/gnuradio/gnuradio.git

GNU Radio is a free software development toolkit that provides signal processing blocks to implement software-defined radios and signal processing systems. It can be used with external radio frequency (RF) hardware to create software-defined radios, or without hardware in a simulation-like environment. It is widely used in hobbyist, academic, and commercial environments to support both wireless communications research and real-world radio systems.

== Overview ==
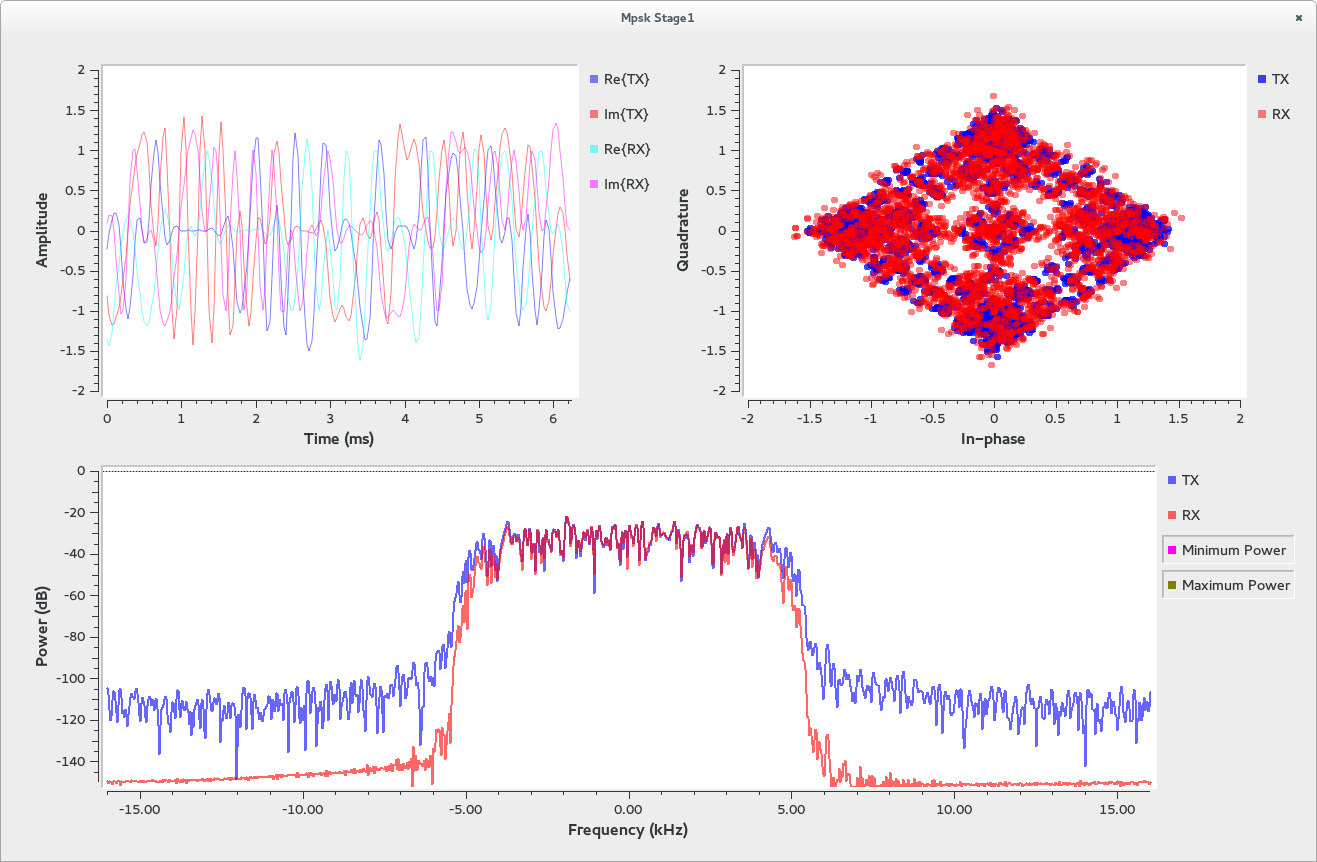
GNU Radio plotting demodulated radio samples

The GNU Radio software provides the framework and tools to build and run software radio or just general signal-processing applications. The GNU Radio applications themselves are generally known as "flowgraphs", which are a series of signal processing blocks connected together, thus describing a data flow.

As with all software-defined radio systems, reconfigurability is a key feature. Instead of using different radios designed for specific but disparate purposes, a single, general-purpose, radio can be used as the radio front-end, and the signal-processing software (here, GNU Radio), handles the processing specific to the radio application.

These flowgraphs can be written in either C++ or Python. The GNU Radio infrastructure is written entirely in C++, and many of the user tools (such as GNU Radio Companion) are written in Python. Flowgraphs can also be constructed in the GNU Radio Companion GUI.

GNU Radio is a signal processing package and part of the GNU Project. It is distributed under the terms of the GNU General Public License (GPL), and most of the project code is copyrighted by the Free Software Foundation.

== History ==
First published in 2001, GNU Radio is an official GNU package. Philanthropist John Gilmore initiated GNU Radio with the funding of $320,000 (US) to Eric Blossom for code creation and project-management duties. One of the first applications was building an ATSC receiver in software.

The GNU Radio software began as a fork of the Pspectra code that was developed by the SpectrumWare project at the Massachusetts Institute of Technology (MIT). In 2004, a complete rewrite of GNU Radio was completed, so today GNU Radio no longer has any original Pspectra code.

Matt Ettus joined the project as one of the first developers, and created the Universal Software Radio Peripheral (USRP) to provide a hardware platform for use with the GNU Radio software. In 2004, Matt founded Ettus Research LLC and began selling USRPs that worked with GNU Radio.

In September 2010, Eric Blossom stepped down as Project Lead and was replaced by Tom Rondeau.

Early in the project, the core developers began holding semi-annual Hackfests. In 2011, the GNU Radio project began holding a yearly conference, called "GRCon", which generally has a Hackfest on the last day of the conference.

In March 2016, Tom Rondeau stepped down and was replaced by Ben Hilburn as the Project Lead, and Johnathan Corgan, a long-time maintainer, as the Chief Architect.

In January 2018, Johnathan Corgan retired from his role as Chief Architect and was replaced by Marcus Müller.

In September 2020, GNU Radio became part of the SETI Institute (a non-profit, multi-disciplinary research and education organization) for all financial and contractual purposes.

In October 2020, Ben Hilburn and the project officers at the time voted to reorganize the GNU Radio Project's leadership, forming a General Assembly with a set of by-laws that regulate details of how the organization operates. A three-member Board made up of elected General Assembly members took over the roles previously handled by the Project Lead.

In mid-2026, GNU Radio 4.0 reached a usable stage of development as a major modernization of the GNU Radio framework. The new version introduces a redesigned runtime, scheduler, and flowgraph architecture, with an emphasis on improved performance, modularity, and easier integration with modern software systems.

== Software ==
=== GNU Radio Companion ===
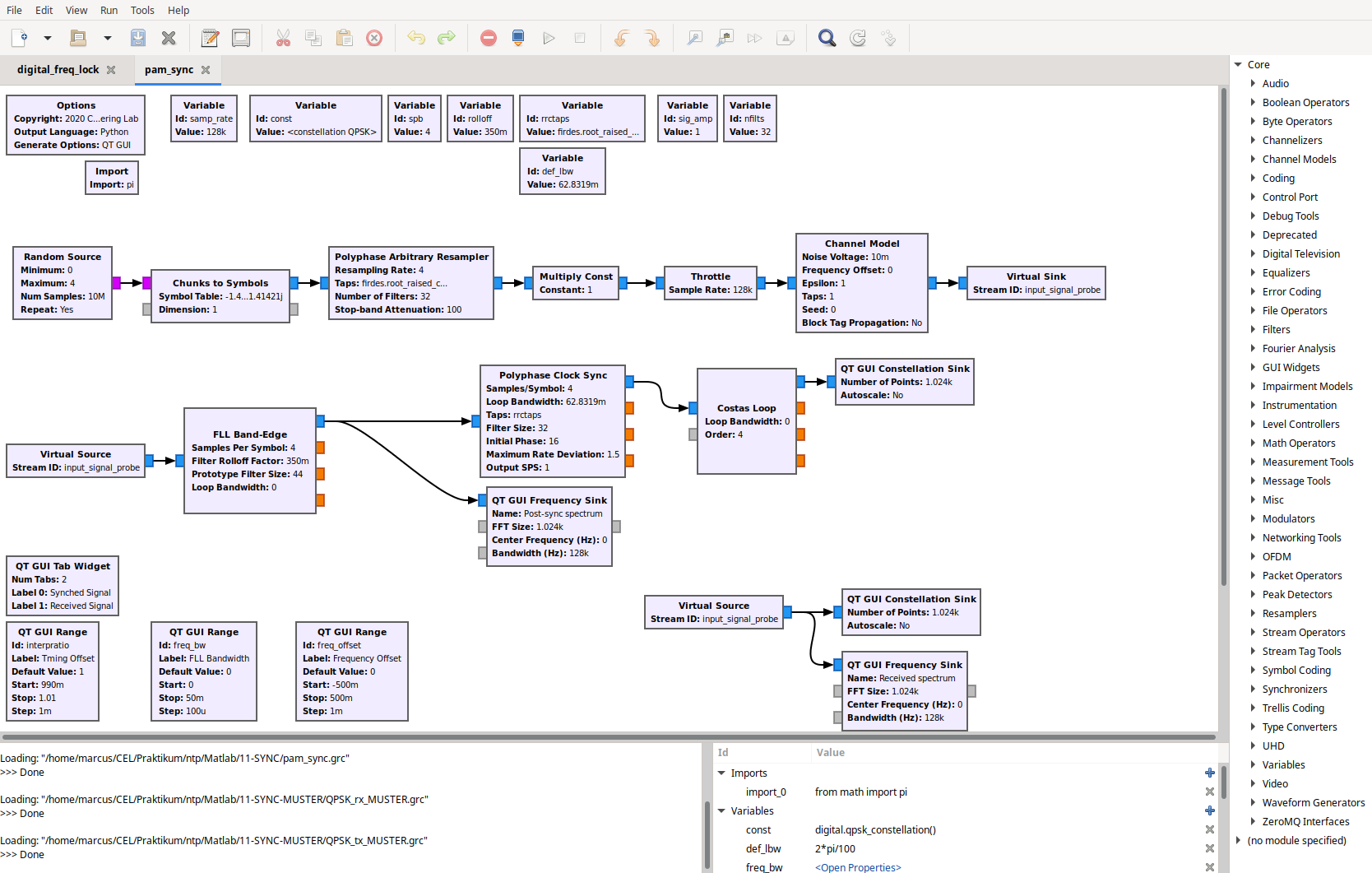
GNU Radio Companion, the GUI tool for GNU Radio Flow Graph design, used to work on a simulation

The GNU Radio Companion is a graphical UI used to develop GNU Radio applications. This is the front-end to the GNU Radio libraries for signal processing. GRC was developed by Josh Blum during his studies at Johns Hopkins University (2006–2007), then distributed as free software for the October 2009 Hackfest. Starting with the 3.2.0 release, GRC was officially bundled with the GNU Radio software distribution.

GRC is effectively a Python code-generation tool. When a flowgraph is compiled in GRC, it generates Python code that creates the desired graphical user interface (GUI) windows and widgets, and creates and connects the blocks in the flowgraph.

GRC currently supports GUI creation using the Qt toolkit.

=== Plotting and Displays ===
GNU Radio provides many common plotting and data visualization data sinks, including FFT displays, symbol constellation diagrams, and scope displays. These are commonly used both for debugging radio applications and as the user-interface to a final application.

=== Out-of-Tree (OOT) Modules ===
Many users create "out-of-tree modules" for use with GNU Radio, which allows users to create their own custom blocks. OOTs typically contain one or more custom blocks, and example flowgraphs to exercise those blocks.

== See also ==
- Software-defined radio
- Universal Software Radio Peripheral
