= Banking and finance in Wales =

Economic sector in Wales

Banking and finance in Wales is the industries of banking and finance in Wales.

== National banks ==
The Development Bank of Wales is an investment bank that was founded by the Welsh Government. It invests in businesses, particularly start-ups by providing growth capital.

Banc Cambria is a proposed Welsh community bank currently under development and aimed to be operating in Wales.

== Building societies ==
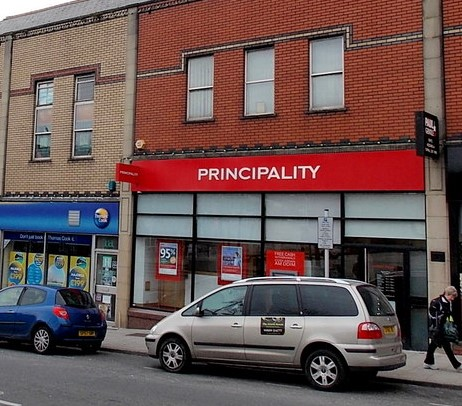
Principality Society branch, Barry

The Swansea Building Society (Welsh: Cymdeithas Adeiladu'r Abertawe) is an independent mutual building society based in Swansea, Wales. It is a member of the Building Societies Association.

The Principality Building Society (Welsh: Cymdeithas Adeiladu'r Principality) is a building society based in Cardiff, Wales. With assets of £10bn it is the largest building society in Wales.

== Insurance ==
Admiral Group plc is a Welsh financial services company headquartered in Cardiff, Wales. Listed on the London Stock Exchange, it is a constituent of the FTSE 100 Index, and markets the Admiral, Bell, Elephant, Diamond and Veygo vehicle insurance brands, as well as launching the price comparison services Confused.com and Compare.com. The group employs more than 10,000 people across its brands.

Thomas Carroll Group plc is a Welsh provider of business and personal insurance, financial management, health & safety and employment law consulting services.
