= Heather Stevens (philanthropist) =

Welsh businesswoman and philanthropist

Dame Heather Stevens CBE
- Born: Heather Vivienne Naylor; 1957 or 1958 (age 68–69)
- Education: Wadham College, Oxford (BA in Psychology)
- Occupations: Businesswoman, philanthropist
- Known for: Co-founder of Admiral Group
- Title: Pro-Chancellor of Cardiff University; High Sheriff of South Glamorgan (2015)
- Spouse: David Stevens (m. 1994)

Dame Heather Vivienne Stevens (née Naylor; born 1957 or 1958) is a Welsh businesswoman and philanthropist. She is Pro-Chancellor of Cardiff University, as well as an Honorary Visiting professor in the College of Biomedical and Life Sciences. and Chair of The Waterloo Foundation (founded 2007), which has given £165 million to causes in Wales.

The first charitable donation given by the Waterloo Foundation was to Global Canopy, a charity that works to prevent deforestation. Since 2014 Heather Stevens has been a trustee of the Ocean Watersports Trust, a charity based in the Vale of Glamorgan and she is also a leading supporter of causes connected with protecting the oceans, such as Oceana.

She graduated in psychology from Wadham College, Oxford. She married David Stevens in 1994. With Stevens and Henry Engelhardt, she co-founded Admiral Insurance, forerunner of the Admiral Group of financial companies, one of Wales's biggest employers, in 1992. In 2010 she was awarded the CBE in the Birthday Honours "for charitable services". She was High Sheriff of South Glamorgan in 2015.
