= Compare.com =

- Formerly: Comparenow.com
- Type: Subsidiary
- Industry: Insurance
- Founded: 2013; 13 years ago
- Founder: Andrew Rose
- Headquarters: Richmond, Virginia, United States
- Key people: Allie Feakins (CEO)
- Products: Auto Insurance Comparison
- Parent: Admiral Group (2013–23); Insurify (2023–present)
- Website: www.compare.com

Compare.com (formerly Comparenow.com) is an American comparison shopping website for car insurance, with headquarters in Richmond, Virginia. Compare.com was owned by its founding investor UK Insurance company Admiral Group, owner of the United Kingdom's first car insurance comparison site.

Insurance carriers on the compare.com panel are contractually obligated to honor the rate presented on compare.com's site, as long as the user's information is correctly entered. Compare.com typically charges the auto insurer on a cost-per-sale basis.

On March 27, 2023, Compare.com was acquired by comparison shopping website Insurify. However, its UK original investor retained a minority stake in the company.

== History ==
Compare.com was launched in 2013 by Andrew Rose, with the majority of its financial backing from Admiral Group. Other investors include Mapfre, which owns 5.6% and White Mountains Insurance Group, the former owners of Esurance, which owns 18.4%. Diane Engelhardt, wife of former Admiral Group CEO Henry Englelhardt, owns 17% as a result of a fresh round of investment in November 2018. The company is currently led by Allie Feakins.

When compare.com began delivering quotes to customers, they did so with partnerships with five carriers. As of March 4, 2016, compare.com works with over 60 carriers to deliver more insurance comparisons to customers.

As of November 2018 Compare.com had received $185 million in total investment, making it one of the most well funded companies in the Insurtech category.

== Relationship with Google ==
In January 2015, the New York Times revealed that Compare.com had formed a partnership with Google, offering them access to Compare.com's panel of carriers in exchange for a share of the royalties paid by the carrier. They join Coverhound and Bolt Solutions in partnering with Google's platform.

Compare.com worked with Google Compare for the duration of their existence in the American car insurance comparison market, until Google Compare announced that they will be withdrawing their service from the market.

== Operations ==
Compare.com operates under primary ownership of Admiral Group, Plc, which operates 14 brands in seven countries. Other companies owned by Admiral include:

- Confused.com (comparison website in the United Kingdom)
- Admiral Insurance (insurance company in the United Kingdom)
- Diamond Insurance (insurance company for female drivers in the United Kingdom)
- Elephant Insurance (insurance company in the United States)
- Balumba (insurance company in Spain)
- Qualitas Auto (insurance company in Spain)
- Assicurazioni ConTe (insurance company in Italy)
- L’olivier assurance auto (insurance company in France)

== National Advertising Campaign ==
In February 2016, compare.com began advertising their service nationally. The advertising campaign features Agent Compare, who works in an underground facility to bring high-tech solutions to the auto insurance industry. Agent Compare promises to "Save Humanity from high insurance rates, one human at a time."

== See also ==
- Jirnexu
- Finansvalp
