= Welsh Development Agency =

Former UK executive agency

- Logo used until a minor rebrand in 2004

Agency overview
- Formed: January 1, 1976
- Dissolved: April 1, 2006
- Type: Executive agency (1976-1999); Assembly Sponsored Public Body (1999-2006)
- Jurisdiction: Wales
- Headquarters: Plas Glyndwr, Cardiff, Wales; 51°28′55″N 3°10′44″W
- Employees: 1020 (2005)
- Child agency: Finance Wales

The Welsh Development Agency (WDA; Welsh: Awdurdod Datblygu Cymru) was an executive agency (or QUANGO) and later designated an Assembly Sponsored Public Body (ASPB). Established in 1976, it was tasked with rescuing the ailing Welsh economy by encouraging business development and investment in Wales, clearing derelict land and encouraging growth of local businesses. In April 2006 the WDA was abolished and its functions were transferred into the Welsh Government.

== History ==
Welsh Development Agency Act 1975 (Note: Section 29(1).)
- Act of Parliament
- Parliament of the United Kingdom
- Long title: An Act to establish a Welsh Development Agency and a Welsh Industrial Development Advisory Board; and for connected purposes.
- Citation: 1975 c. 70
- Territorial extent: England and Wales; Scotland; Northern Ireland (in part); (Note: Section 29(3).)

Dates
- Royal assent: 12 November 1975
- Commencement: 1 January 1975 (Note: Section 29(2). The Welsh Development Agency Act 1975 (Commencement) Order 1975.)
- Repealed: 10 September 2025
Other legislation
Amended by	Acquisition of Land Act 1981; Coal Industry Act 1987; Coal Industry Act 1994; Statute Law (Repeals) Act 2004; Postal Services Act 2011; Wales Act 2014
Repealed by	Legislation (Procedure, Publication and Repeals) (Wales) Act 2025

Status: Repealed

Text of statute as originally enacted

Revised text of statute as amended

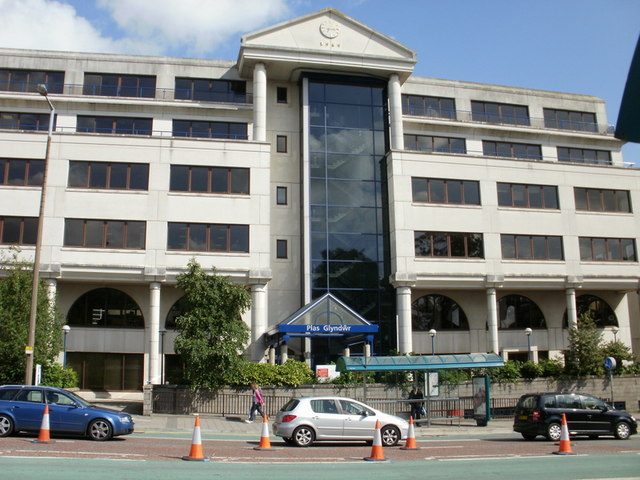
Agency's headquarters in Cardiff

The WDA was established under the Welsh Development Agency Act 1975 (c. 70) under the then Secretary of State for Wales John Morris MP for Aberavon. The WDA had four objectives:

1. furthering the economic development of Wales
2. promoting industrial efficiency and international competitiveness
3. creating and safeguarding employment
4. improving the environment having regard to existing amenity.

The organisation worked to secure entrepreneurial growth in Wales by increasing the number of startup businesses and by persuading multinational companies to relocate or open subsidiary facilities in Wales. Finance Wales is a public limited company set up by the WDA and still providing funding to Welsh businesses.

Employing several hundred workers, the WDA was argued to be one of Wales's most important institutions with a network of offices worldwide and their headquarters in the former Bank of Wales building in Cardiff. In its 30-year history the WDA reports claim credit for helping to create hundreds of thousands of jobs and securing billions of pounds in investment. It even enjoyed the praise of then Prime Minister Margaret Thatcher, who claimed it was doing a marvelous job. The WDA had an annual budget of approximately £70 million per year.

=== Success ===
After some governance issues were brought to light in the early 1990s (see "Controversy" below), the Government appointed David Rowe-Beddoe (later Lord Rowe-Beddoe) as Chairman in 1993. Rowe-Beddoe appointed an inquiry led by Sir John Caines in late 1993, which led to new executives being appointed. The changes included new Legal Director and new Agency Secretary in 1994 who attended Public Accounts Committees and worked with the National Audit Office and the Welsh Office under Sir Michael Scholar CB in 1994-96, creating an agency which conformed with the Nolan Principles and was the first UK QUANGO to have a Code of Practice. The Agency reported to John Redwood, David Hunt and William Hague as Secretaries of State for Wales under the Thatcher and Major governments.

The Agency regained its spot as a lead inward investment and job creation agency in the late 1990s in the UK. It was credited with having brought in, secured and safeguarded investment with major companies such as Ford, Bosch, Panasonic, Sony, Hoover, TRW, Anglesey Aluminium, Toyota, British Airways, TRW and General Electric. It gained prominence in bringing in financial services companies such as Legal & General and Lloyds Bank into Wales and later on key back office call centres came into Wales.

With South Glamorgan County Council, the WDA helped establish Admiral Insurance plc, which is now a FTSE 100 Company.

The WDA contributed to the building of the Millennium Stadium and the walk way for the 1999 Rugby World Cup and the Millennium Centre. It assisted in the establishment of the National Botanic Garden for Wales and the Llanelli Coastal Path. It removed contaminated land and reclaimed and removed coal tips in South Wales through the world leader in the field, Gwyn Griffiths OBE. Success included partnerships with newly created 22 local authorities in the mid 1990s on urban regeneration and Town Improvement Grants. It worked in the EU with an Office in Brussels namely the Wales European Centre ensuring it gained European funding with the Welsh Office.

It led the successful bid with Sir Terry Matthews for the Ryder Cup at Celtic Manor Resort, which was being built at the time near Newport. It also established Finance Wales plc.

Other public bodies, including the Development Board for Rural Wales, the Land Authority for Wales, Technical Enterprise Councils and the Cardiff Bay Development Corporation, were merged into WDA by the Government of Wales Act 1998.

=== Merger ===
The WDA ceased to exist on 1 April 2006, when it and two other ASPBs - the Wales Tourist Board and ELWa - were merged into the Welsh Government. The current Welsh Government Cabinet Secretary for Economy, Infrastructure and Skills is Ken Skates AM, although Ieuan W Jones was the Minister for the Economy and Transport at the time of the merger.

The Swansea AM Andrew Davies made the decision to abolish the WDA in conjunction with the First Minister of Wales Rhodri Morgan.

== Controversy ==
In the early 1990s the WDA attracted controversy when its chairman, Gwyn Jones, a businessman, was appointed by the then Welsh Secretary, Peter Walker after meeting him at a Conservative Party fundraising lunch. He later resigned from the post ahead of a 1992 Commons Public Accounts Committee report that condemned the agency for:

- giving out illegal redundancy payments totalling £1.4m between 1989 and 1992;
- paying £228,000 to ensure non disclosure from former executive, Mike Price, whom it sacked following internal conflict in 1991;
- allowing free private motoring for board members between 1984 and 1992;
- allowing chairman, Dr Gwyn Jones, to obtain a £16,895 WDA rural development grant for one purpose, but when he used it for another without informing the Agency as required, he was not asked to pay it back when a WDA inspector detected the change;
- flying directors on Concorde; and
- using public money to investigate a management buyout that would have privatised the agency. A sum of £308,000 was discovered in the 1988-1989 accounts to pay for a feasibility study to this end.

The Commons Public Accounts committee became concerned when the Auditor General, Sir John Bourn, discovered many irregularities during his annual examination of the Agency's accounts.

Criticism also followed the appointments of Neil Carignan and Neil Smith by Gwyn Jones. Carignan's employment was terminated over his poor performance, but he was allowed to take £53,000 of office equipment with him. Smith was hired as a marketing director, but the WDA failed to check his CV, which was fraudulent, and that he was a discharged bankrupt. Smith was later investigated by police over his hiring of models for claimed promotional work, and he was later convicted of theft and deception and went to prison.

In 2006 the WDA was abolished in difficult circumstances in a statement at the National Assembly which took Assembly Members by surprise. The Agency had appointed Graham Hawker as CEO who was in the middle of a reorganisation at the time reversing the regional offices created in 1995 to centralised offices without consultation with the Minister. Hawker resigned in controversial circumstances after the abolition announcement without informing the Minister Andrew Davies AM and the Chair Sir Roger Jones at an Economic Development Committee of the Assembly chaired by Alun Cairns then AM now an MP for the Vale Of Glamorgan, this was unprecedented. Hawker was the CEO of Welsh Water PLC prior to his controversial appointment as the WDA CEO. Welsh Water PLC had to be rescued by the new Dwr Cymru mutual led by Lord Byrnes.

== Welsh Affairs Committee scrutiny ==
In February 2011, a report of the House of Commons Welsh Affairs Committee argues that the abolition of the Welsh Development Agency has reduced Wales's visibility in the global marketplace. The committee claims that, five years on, the WDA remains one of the most recognisable Welsh brands and argues that the establishment of a successor trade promotion agency should be a priority for the Welsh Government. The report also argues for greater engagement by the Welsh Government with parliament on the issue.

The Committee's report received a mixed response in the Senedd. Conservative AMs tabled a motion endorsing one contributor's statement (Professor Brian Morgan) that "the closure of the WDA and the abolition of the ‘WDA brand’ will probably go down in history as the worst policy decision made in Wales in living memory". In response, Business Minister Edwina Hart accused those holding such views as "wanting to revisit the past".

A highly critical report of Inward Investment attraction was also published by Cardiff Business School in 2012. The report "Selling Wales" was an assessment of the agencies involved and argued that the lack of a consistent brand was one of the most significant problems.
