= Ogbonnaya Onu Polytechnic =

Public polytechnic in Aba, Abia State, Nigeria

Coordinates: 5.1282604°N 7.3624921°E

- Motto: Towards Excellence in Technology
- Type: Public
- Established: 1992
- Location: Aba, Abia State, Nigeria
- Website: https://abiastatepolytechnic.edu.ng

Ogbonnaya Onu Polytechnic (Abia State Polytechnic) is a state government-owned Polytechnic established in 1992, and located in Aba, Abia State, Nigeria. The Polytechnic is composed of different schools, such as the School of Science & Engineering and the School of Business Administration.

The school's colors are yellow and dark red. The former rector is Onukaogu Abalogun A. The Polytechnic is near the Eyimba International Stadium in Aba.

The Governor of Abia State, Dr Alex Otti appointed Dr Okoro Christopher Kalu as the rector of Polytechnic in March 2024.

== History ==
The Ogbonnaya Onu Polytechnic, Aba was established by edit No.8 of 1994 which has a retrospective effect from October 1992. Its location is the former Girls Technical College(GTC) Aba, along Aba Owerri road. The initial intake comprises students taking various certificate programmes. The National Diploma Programmes commenced in the 1994/1995 academic year. The higher National Diploma Programmes were introduced in the 1999/2000 session.

On November 7, 2024, the Polytechnic which was until then known as Abia State Polytechnic was renamed to Ogbonnaya Onu Polytechnic, Aba, to honour the legacy of the first Executive Governor of the state, the late Dr. Ogbonnaya Onu.

== Library ==
The library provides online and hard copy information resources both online and hard copies that supports teaching and learning in the polytechnic. The head librarian is Chigozie Martin Ndulaka.

== Faculties and courses offered ==
According to the latest version of JAMB admission brochure, Abia State Polytechnic offers the following courses/programmes at National Diploma (ND) level.

School of Business and Management Technology

- Accountancy
- Banking and Finance
- Business Administration and Management
- Public Administration
- Office Management and Technology

School of Engineering Technology

- Civil Engineering Technology (ND only)
- Computer Engineering Technology (ND only)
- Electrical Electronics Engineering Technology (ND only)
- Mechanical Engineering Technology (ND only)

School of Environmental Design and Technology

- Architecture
- Building Technology
- Estate Management
- Quantity Surveying
- Urban and Regional Planning
- Surveying and Geo-Informatics

School of Food Science and Technology

- Food Science and Technology (ND only)

School of Science and Engineering Technology

- Computer Science
- School of Science and Industrial Technology
- Science Laboratory Technology
- Statistics
- Physics with Electronics

Courses like Biology/Microbiology and Chemistry/Biochemistry are only available at HND level.

== See also ==
- List of polytechnics in Nigeria
