= David Stevens =

David or Dave Stevens may refer to:

- David Stevens, Baron Stevens of Ludgate (born 1936), Conservative Independent peer in the House of Lords
- David Stevens (businessman) (born 1962), British businessman, CEO of Admiral Group
- David Stephens, vocalist for the band We Came as Romans
- Dave Stevens (1955–2008), illustrator
- Dave Stevens (baseball) (born 1970), American baseball player
- Dave Stevens (amputee sportsman) (born 1966), athlete and sports broadcaster
- David Stevens (screenwriter) (1940–2018), Australian Academy-award nominated screenwriter for Breaker Morant
- David Stevens (politician), American politician, Member of the Arizona House of Representatives

== See also ==
- David Stephens (disambiguation)
