= Carroll Group (disambiguation) =

Carroll Group may refer to:

- Carroll Group An international property group that collapsed in the 1990s.
- Thomas Carroll Group A Welsh financial services group.
