= Christopher Okoro =

Nigerian academic

Rector of Abia State Polytechnic
- Incumbent
- Assumed office March 18, 2024
- Preceded by: Chidinma Ndukwe

Personal details
- Born: December 2, 1986 (age 39)
- Education: Madonna University, Okija; University of Lagos; Michael Okpara University of Agriculture, Umudike
- Occupation: Academic; author
- Profession: Electrical Engineer

Christopher Kalu Okoro (born December 1986) is a Nigerian doctor of Electrical Power and Machines (Control of Drives). In March 2024, he became the 11th Substantive Rector, Abia State Polytechnic, Aba.

== Early life and education ==
Okoro was born in Abam in Arochukwu, Abia State. He studied Electrical/Electronics Engineering at Madonna University in Okija of Anambra State, where he graduated at the best graduating student of the Faculty of Engineering in 2008. He also graduated from a master's degree programme in Control Systems Engineering at University of Lagos. He obtained a Doctor of Philosophy degree in Control of Drives from Michael Okpara University of Agriculture, Umudike (MOUAU), Abia State.

== Career ==
From 2014 to 2024, Okoro served as a senior lecturer and Academic Adviser at Michael Okpara University of Agriculture, Umudike. He also served as the Staff Adviser, Centre for Continuing Education, in the same institution. He became the 11th Substantive Rector of Abia State Polytechnic, Aba, in March 2024. He is currently the Staff Adviser, Abia State Students' Association. In 2016, he was appointed as a member of the Council for the Regulation of Engineering (COREN).
