= David Stephens (disambiguation) =

David Stephens (born 1989) is a British footballer who plays for Barnet as a defender.

David Stephens may also refer to:

- David Stephens (parliamentary official) (1910–1990), British public servant
- David Stephens (Wisconsin politician) (1837–1910), American politician and building contractor in Wisconsin
- David Stephens (rugby) rugby union and rugby league footballer of the 1960s and 1970s
- Dave Stephens (javelin thrower) (born 1962), American former javelin thrower
- Dave Stephens (runner) (1928–2024), Australian former long-distance runner
- Dave Stephens (singer) (born 1988), singer/songwriter and frontman for We Came as Romans

== See also ==
- David Stevens (disambiguation)
