= Land Authority for Wales =

UK government agency, 1976–1999

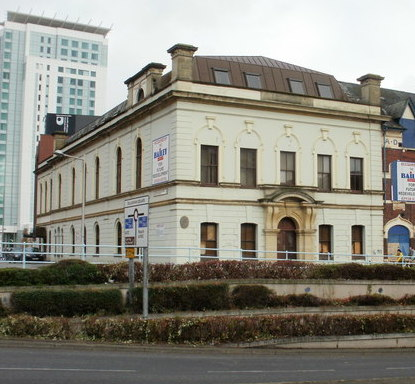
Headquarters of Land Authority in Cardiff

Land Authority for Wales (LAW; Welsh: Awdurdod Tir Cymru) was an executive agency of the UK Government.

== History ==
The Land Authority for Wales was established in 1976 under the Community Land Act 1975. Its role was to buy land on behalf of the UK Government for industrial or other forms of development in order to encourage economic growth. The authority was abolished in 1999 under the Government of Wales Act 1998 and its functions passed to the Welsh Development Agency.
