= David Stevens (businessman) =

British businessman

- Born: David Graham Stevens
- Education: University of Oxford; INSEAD
- Occupation: Businessman
- Title: CEO, Admiral Group
- Term: 2016–2020
- Predecessor: Henry Engelhardt
- Spouse: Heather Stevens (m. 1994)

David Graham Stevens is a British businessman, and was CEO of Admiral Group from 2016–2020.

== Early and personal life ==
David Graham Stevens graduated from the University of Oxford. He earned an MBA from INSEAD in 1988.

Stevens married Heather Stevens (née Naylor) in 1994.

== Career ==
Stevens worked for McKinsey & Company from 1988 to 1991.

In May 2015, it was announced that the founder of Admiral, Henry Engelhardt, would step down as CEO, and be replaced in 2016 by Stevens, the COO.

In March 2020, Stevens announced his retirement as CEO of Admiral.

== Awards ==
Stevens was appointed a CBE in the 2010 Birthday Honours list "For services to the insurance industry and to charity".

Business positions
Preceded by Henry Engelhardt	CEO of Admiral Group; 2016–present	Incumbent
