= Insurify =

American insurance comparison shopping website

- Formerly: Ensurify
- Type: Private
- Industry: Insurance, comparison insurance website
- Founded: 2013; 13 years ago, Cambridge, Massachusetts, United States
- Founder: Snejina Zacharia, Giorgos Zacharia, Tod Kiryazov
- Headquarters: Cambridge, Massachusetts, United States
- Key people: Snejina Zacharia (Co-CEO) Giorgos Zacharia (Co-CEO)
- Website: insurify.com

Insurify is an American insurance comparison shopping website headquartered in Cambridge, Massachusetts. Partnering with insurance companies like Nationwide, Farmers, and Liberty Mutual, Insurify is licensed and operating in all 50 states and Washington, D.C. The platform has collected more than 100,000 reviews from customers.

== History ==
Insurify was founded in 2013 by Snejina Zacharia, MIT Sloan fellow and Giorgos Zacharia, former president of Kayak.com metasearch engine and Tod Kiryazov, CPO, MBA.

In January 2015, the company secured $2M of funding in a seed round led by Rationalwave Capital Partners and other angel investors. The funding was used to officially launch its marketplace website.

Insurify started offering its online insurance quote comparison marketplace publicly in July 2015 in Texas, California, and Florida. The company established relationships with auto insurance carriers and auto insurance brokers that allowed it to provide personalized insurance quotes based on a user's profile, vehicle, and driving history. By January 2016, Insurify had expanded coverage to 30 states. The website lets users type in their ZIP code, answer questions about their car(s) and driving record and compare auto insurance quotes from major insurance carriers including Liberty Mutual, Metlife, The Travelers Companies, Safeco, The General, Nationwide Mutual Insurance Company, GEICO, Progressive, Allstate, and State Farm. Insurify is officially accredited and operates in all 50 states.

In October 2016, Insurify raised $4.6M of funding in a seed round, led by MassMutual Ventures and Nationwide Ventures and also launched a Facebook Messenger chat bot, which allows users to compare and buy insurance directly from Facebook Messenger.

In January 2020, Insurify announced it raised $23M in Series A funding, led by MTech Capital and Viola FinTech, with support from Hearst Ventures, MassMutual Ventures, and Nationwide. In the same month, Insurify announced that it was expanding into home, renters, and life insurance in addition to auto insurance.

In 2021, Insurify raised $100 million in a Series B funding round led by Motive Partners.

In March 2023, Insurify acquired Compare.com, a pioneer in the U.S. online auto insurance comparison market.

In March 2025, Insurify co-founder and board member Giorgos Zacharias was appointed co-CEO of Insurify.

== Operations ==
Insurify is an insurance comparison website that uses predictive modeling in order to make shopping for car insurance easier. The available insurance service areas are: auto, home, life, pet and renters insurance. Insurify is the operator of Evia (Expert Virtual Insurance Agent), which allows users to search for car insurance by texting a photo of their license plate. The company invented RateRank, a proprietary software that matches each driver's profile and risk levels to the best insurance carrier and coverage. Insurify’s AI-driven API integrates with over 120+ insurance carriers, allowing the company to offer real-time quotes and personalized insurance shopping for auto, home, pet, renters, life, and travel coverage.
