= Development Bank of Wales =

Welsh Government-owned bank

Development Bank of Wales plc
- Native name: Banc Datblygu Cymru ccc (Welsh)
- Type: Public limited company
- Industry: Financial services
- Headquarters: Wrexham, Wales, UK
- Key people: Sally Bridgeland (Chair); Giles Thorley (Chief Executive)
- Number of employees: 275 (approximate)
- Parent: Welsh Government (100%; formerly Welsh Development Agency)
- Website: developmentbank.wales

The Development Bank of Wales (branded as simply Banc; Welsh: Banc Datblygu Cymru) is a Welsh development bank that provides financial support for Welsh businesses, property developers and homeowners and is owned by the Welsh Government. The bank provides loans for businesses to start up, scale and grow and also provides equity investments for early stage and established businesses.

== Services ==
The Group manages funds in excess of £2 billion and consists of the fund managers Development Bank of Wales and FW Capital, which invest in SMEs as well as Angels Invest Wales, a business angel network. In 2025 the company marked £1 billion of investment since its launch in 2017.

The Development Bank of Wales Group can make debt, mezzanine and equity investments of up to £10 million at all stages (early stage, development capital, as well as succession and acquisition) and also structures follow-on investments for its portfolio. The Group also syndicates/co-invests.

Development Bank of Wales has five offices across Wales – Wrexham, Llandudno, Newtown, Cardiff and Llanelli.

The Development Bank of Wales was launched in October 2017, replacing its predecessor Finance Wales (2001–2017).

It also manages a number of specialist financial products on behalf of the Welsh Government including Help to Buy - Wales, Green Homes Wales, Help to Stay, Self Build Wales and the Leaseholder Support Scheme.

The Development Bank of Wales offers infrastructure products through the Local Energy Fund and as the public equity holder in the Mutual Investment Model (MIMS) which develops large scale infrastructure like schools, hospitals and roads.

In 2018, Economic Intelligence Wales was launched as part of the Development Bank of Wales Group. A collaboration between Cardiff University, the Office of National Statistics and the Development Bank of Wales, Economic Intelligence Wales collates and analyses data to create independent, robust and reliable insight to help better understand and improve the Welsh economy.

== See also ==
- List of national development banks
- Economy of Wales
