= Jirnexu =

Southeast Asian financial technology company

JIRNEXU
- Type: Private
- Industry: Financial technology
- Founded: 2012
- Headquarters: Kuala Lumpur, Malaysia
- Key people: Yuen Tuck Siew (Chief Executive Officer); Liew Ooi Hann (Chief Financial Officer); James Barnes (Chief Operating Officer); Lucas Ooi (Chief Commercial Officer & Head of Insurance); Cedric Viver (Chief Technology Officer); James Wong (Chief Business Development Officer)
- Products: ringgitplus.com
- Services: Online financial aggregator, customer lifecycle management
- Number of employees: 51–100 (2017)
- Website: jirnexu.com

Jirnexu Sdn Bhd is a Southeast Asian financial technology startup headquartered in Kuala Lumpur, Malaysia. The company provides technology to help financial institutions manage different stages of the customer journey: marketing, acquisition, fulfilment and retention. It has business-to-business (B2B) and business-to-consumer (B2C) operations in Malaysia and Indonesia.

== History ==
=== 2012-2015: Founding ===
Jirnexu was formerly known as Saving Plus. In 2012, former Citi banker Yuen Tuck Siew and James Barnes founded RinggitPlus.com, a comparison and application website for financial products in Malaysia. The website was officially launched in 2013 to allow comparison of and application for credit cards, home loans, car loans, investments and insurance schemes.

In 2014, RinggitPlus.com merged with SaveMoney.my, an online portal that provides information on different credit cards, car loans, phone, travel and shopping in Malaysia. SaveMoney.my was founded by Liew Ooi Hann and Lucas Ooi in 2012. Following the merger, Saving Plus Sdn Bhd was incorporated while RinggitPlus.com continued to operate as a comparison website.

=== 2016-present: Rebrand as Jirnexu ===
In 2016, Saving Plus rebranded itself to Jirnexu; the name means "prosper" in Maltese. The company launched XpressApply, an online application and CRM technology.

Several venture capital firms have funded Jirnexu, including SBI Group, Celebes Capital, NTT DoCoMo Ventures, Nullabor, Tuas Capital Partners, Anfield Equities, Digital Media Partners, Gobi Partners, OSK Ventures International Berhad and private investor Steve Melhuish.

In October 2017, Jirnexu reported having total funding of US$8.0 million.

== See also ==
- Personal finance
- Financial services
- Financial technology
- FinTech SaaS
