= Finansvalp =

Swedish price comparison service

Finansvalp is a price comparison service and information site that writes about and compares banking services. Finansvalp was founded by Olle Pettersson in March 2021.

== Operations ==
Finansvalp.se was started as a hobby project by Olle Pettersson in March 2021 but has been run and owned by Haveton AB since June 2022, where Olle Pettersson is a partner and CEO.

Finansvalp's editorial team writes about and compares personal loans, mortgage loans, savings accounts, and credit cards. The editorial staff consists of economists and journalists and the presenter and personal finance expert Magdalena Kowalczyk, who fact-checks the content.

Finansvalp collaborates with banks and credit institutions through affiliate networks and receives compensation, when site visitors choose to become customers of one of Finansvalp's partners.

The main purpose of the site is to compare banking services, but the editorial team also conducts various studies, such as price differences on different meal boxes, differences in gender equality at workplaces in the EU, which European country worries the most about money and which European capital is the cheapest to live in.

Finansvalp.se is named after the term “finansvalp” which refers to young employees within banks and brokerage firms, who make quick deals with large profits.

== Finansvalp scholarship ==
Finansvalp offers an annual scholarship of 7,500 SEK for students writing a bachelor's or master's thesis in economics.
