= Banc Cambria =

Proposed Welsh community bank

- Industry: Financial services
- Products: Retail banking Business banking
- Owner: Monmouthshire Building Society
- Parent: Cambria Cydfuddiannol Ltd

Banc Cambria is a proposed Welsh community bank currently under development and aimed to be operating in Wales. It was originally proposed for 2023, but later delayed.

== Formation and structure ==
The Monmouthshire Building Society had been working with the Welsh Government and Cambria Cydfuddiannol Ltd (CCL) to form Banc Cambria by 2023.

The aim was to develop a community bank across all of Wales, with the provision of retail banking services by 2023.

The Welsh Government has disclosed that 30 branches could be opened across Wales in the next decade. Social Minister for Wales, Jane Hutt stated to Senedd members, "It's going to be a mutual owned by and run for the benefit of its members". Banc Cambria aims to provide a full banking service across all of Wales and differently to other typical banks, it will be owned and ran by its own members rather than shareholders.

In February 2023, Minister for the Economy, Vaughan Gething stated the bank would not be set up in 2023 as originally proposed, and was delayed due to the economic climate.

In July 2023, Monmouthshire Building Society announced that it will no longer be working to deliver the community bank due to "the current unpredictability and ongoing challenges facing the UK economy". Vaughan Gething said the Welsh Government remains committed to delivering a community bank and will be seeking a new partner in the finance sector to take the plans forward.

=== Naming ===
"Banc" in Welsh for bank, whereas "Cambria" is the Latin name for Wales, being the Latinised form of the Welsh name for the country, Cymru.
