= Henry Engelhardt =

American billionaire businessman

- Born: Henry Allan Engelhardt; January 17, 1958 (age 68); Chicago, Illinois, U.S.
- Education: University of Michigan; INSEAD
- Occupation: Businessman
- Years active: 1979–present
- Title: Chief executive, Admiral Group plc
- Term: 2004–2016
- Successor: David Stevens, CBE
- Spouse: Diane Brière de l'Isle
- Children: 4

Henry Allan Engelhardt (born January 17, 1958) is an American businessman, and the founder and former chief executive of Admiral Group, a Welsh motor insurance company. He was credited as driving the company in to a position where it became one of Britain's most valuable companies and stepped down as chief executive in 2016 to make way for a younger management team to take the group forward.

== Early life ==
Engelhardt was born to a Jewish family on January 17, 1958, in Chicago, the son of Annette (née Bernstein) and Sheldon Arthur Engelhardt. His father owned a successful meatpacking operation in Chicago. He has a sister and a brother, Karen Engelhardt Stern and Joel Engelhardt. He attended Evanston Township High School, and was educated at the University of Michigan, and has a joint degree in journalism and radio, television and film. He followed his French girlfriend (now wife) to Europe where he studied for an MBA at Insead.

== Career ==
Engelhardt became part of the founding team at Churchill Insurance, where he developed his way of doing business.

In 1993, he launched Admiral Group. In 1999, he led a management buy out of the business which has since become a constituent of the FTSE 100 Index.

In September 2012, the Engelhardt family owned more than 14% of Admiral Group.

In March 2017, he became CEO of Elephant Insurance Services, a US subsidiary of Admiral Group.

In 2021 Engelhardt was made an independent non-executive director of the Welsh Rugby Union.

In 2026 Engelhardt and his wife, Diane Briere de L'isle were awarded the First Ministers Award at the St David Awards for their philanthropic work and job creation within Wales through Admiral Insurance.

== Personal life ==
Engelhardt is married to Diane Briere de L'isle; they have four children. The family lives in Cardiff, Wales.

In February 2026, Henry Engelhardt was listed on The Sunday Times tax list with his wealth estimated at £25.6 Million.
