= Thomas Carroll Group =

- Industry: Financial Services
- Founded: 1972
- Founder: Evan Thomas; Terry Carroll
- Headquarters: Caerphilly, Wales
- Number of locations: Caerphilly, Swansea, Pembrokeshire, Hereford, London
- Key people: John Moore MBE, Chairman
- Services: Business Insurance, Personal Insurance, Business Financial Advice, Personal Financial Advice, Health and Safety, Employment Law and Legal Indemnities
- Divisions: The four subsidiaries within the group include: Thomas Carroll Brokers Limited, Thomas Carroll Financial Advisers Limited, Thomas Carroll Private Clients Limited and Thomas Carroll Management Services Limited.
- Website: www.thomascarroll.co.uk

Thomas Carroll Group plc is a British provider of business and personal insurance, financial management, health & safety and employment law consulting services.

At the British Insurance Awards in 2014, Thomas Carroll Brokers were named "Insurance Brokers of the Decade".

The company has been regularly included in the Sunday Times Top 100 Best Small Company to work for.

On 1 April 2016 the group bought the Monmouthshire Insurance Services business from Monmouthshire Building Society.
