= Admiral Group =

Motor insurance company

Admiral Group plc

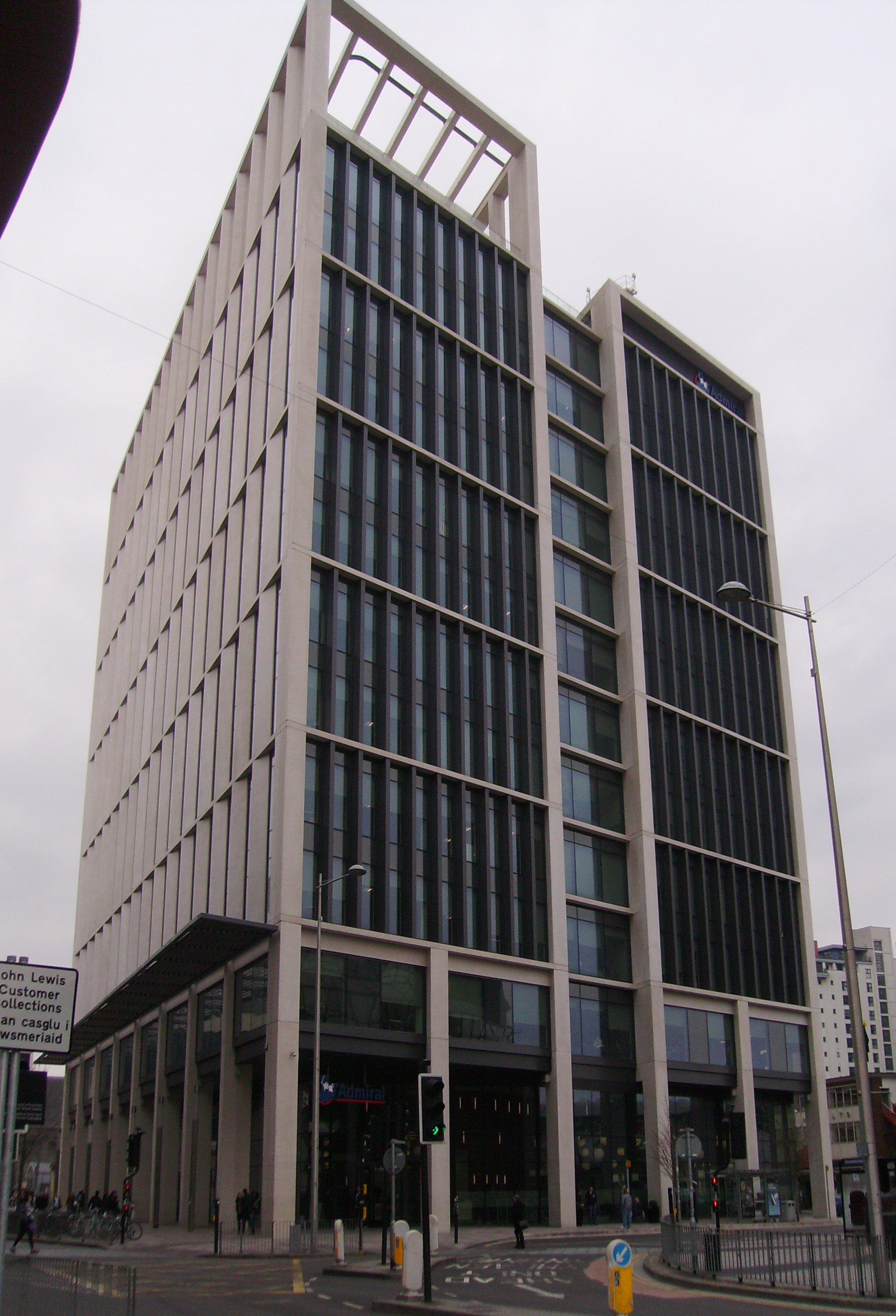
- Tŷ Admiral, the head office of the Admiral Group
- Type: Public
- Traded as: LSE: ADM; FTSE 100 Component
- Industry: Insurance
- Founded: 1991; 35 years ago
- Headquarters: Cardiff, Wales, UK
- Key people: Mike Rogers (chairman); Milena Mondini de Focatiis (CEO)
- Services: Motor insurance; Home insurance; Travel insurance; Pet insurance; Personal lending
- Revenue: ▲£4,979.3 million (2025)
- Operating income: ▲£981.9 million (2025)
- Net income: ▲£742.3 million (2025)
- Number of employees: c. 15,000 (2025)
- Website: admiralgroup.co.uk

Admiral Group plc is a British financial services company headquartered in Cardiff, Wales. Listed on the London Stock Exchange, it is a constituent of the FTSE 100 Index, and markets the Admiral, Bell, Elephant, Diamond and Veygo insurance brands, and founded the price comparison services Confused.com, which it sold in 2021, and Compare.com.

== History ==
The business started as a division of the Brockbank Group in 1991. In November 1999, Henry Engelhardt led a management buy-out of the Admiral Group from the Brockbank Group backed by Barclays Private Equity. On 23 September 2004, Admiral floated on the London Stock Exchange.

In September 2004, the Admiral Group plc announced the pricing of its initial public offering, at an offer price of 275 pence per existing ordinary share. Based on the offer price, the market capitalisation of Admiral at the commencement of dealings on the London Stock Exchange was £711 million.

On 13 May 2015, it was announced that Engelhardt, would step down as CEO, and be replaced in 2016 by David Stevens, the COO.

On 1 January 2021, David Stevens stepped down as CEO to be replaced by Milena Mondini de Focatiis.

In April 2021, Admiral finalised the sale of interests, that included its Cardiff-based price comparison firm Confused.com, to RVU for proceeds of £508m.

In December 2023, Admiral agreed to acquire RSA Insurance UK's home and pet insurance business, including the 'More Than' brand, in a deal worth up to £115 million. The acquisition was completed in April 2024.

Admiral entered the United States market in 2009 with Elephant Insurance, a direct motor insurer based in Richmond, Virginia, which also sold home, renters, motorcycle and life cover in eight states. In April 2025 the group agreed to sell the business, comprising Elephant Insurance Company and Elephant Insurance Services, to the private investment firm J.C. Flowers & Co. for an undisclosed cash consideration representing approximately the net asset value of Elephant, saying the sale would allow it to focus on the United Kingdom and mainland Europe. The sale was completed with effect from 31 December 2025.

In February 2026, Admiral announced an agreement to acquire commercial fleet insurer Flock for £80 million, subject to regulatory approval. Admiral announced on 1 June 2026 that it had completed the acquisition, after regulatory approval.
