= Reverend Flowers =

Reverend Flowers may refer to:

- Paul Flowers (banker), former chairman of the Co-operative Bank and a Methodist minister
- Reverend Flowers, a fictional character on the 1988 Australian soap opera Home and Away
