= David Thorburn =

David Thorburn may refer to:

- David Thorburn (politician) (1790–1862), Scottish-born merchant and political figure in Upper Canada
- David Thorburn (banker) (born 1958), Scottish banker
- David Thorburn (scholar), American literature scholar
