= International Safety Products =

- Company type: Private company
- Industry: Marine safety equipment
- Founded: 1981
- Defunct: 2015
- Fate: Acquired
- Successor: Safety and Survival Systems International Ltd (3Si)
- Headquarters: Bootle, United Kingdom
- Area served: United Kingdom
- Products: lifejackets, military tactical waistcoats, marine safety devices, life rafts and rescue boats
- Owner: Alliance Marine Group
- Number of employees: 100 (2013)
- Website: www.ispl.co.uk www.3sisafety.com

International Safety Products (ISP) was a British company based in Merseyside, that manufactured inflatable marine lifejackets and was an official importer, supplier and distributor of other marine survival products. As of 2013, the firm had a turnover in excess of £7m and employed more than 100 staff at its headquarters in Bootle and in Birkenhead.

The company was acquired in 2015 by Safety and Survival Systems International Ltd (3Si) which would later be acquired by Alliance Marine Group.

== History ==
ISP began trading in 1981.

It was bought out by its management team, John Rogers and Geoff Billington, in 2008. Funding was provided by Alliance Fund Managers through the Merseyside Special Investment Fund and The Co-operative Bank.

By 2012, ISP manufactured more than 170,000 products a year.

In 2012, the firm completed a deal to supply all passenger boats operating in the Lake District with lifejackets.

ISP specialised in tactical waistcoats, used by armed forces, special forces and police forces around the world. It also produces a range of immersion suits under its own Intrepid brand.

In May 2012, ISP became the sole UK supplier of Duarry Challenger liferafts and rescue boats.

ISP also provided marine safety electronic products. In 2013, ISP signed a deal to become the UK distributor for the Ocean Signal brand of personal location devices. The firm was the exclusive UK supplier of the SeaMate HRU VE-1 disposable hydrostatic release unit. The product was engineered to sever life rafts from their parent boat upon contact with water. While most hydrostatic release units typically had a working lifespan of around two years, the SeaMate HRU VE-1 model has been designed to last more than 50% longer, requiring replacement at three-year intervals.

In 2015, the company was acquired by Safety and Survival Systems International Ltd (3Si) which kept the brand. 3Si was later acquired by Alliance Marine in 2018 which dropped the brand and merged it with its other businesses.
