= Customer Union for Ethical Banking =

- Founded: February 2016
- Headquarters: Unit 21, 41 Old Birley Street, Manchester, M15 5RF
- Location: United Kingdom
- Members: 1,200 (2019)
- Website: saveourbank.coop

The Customer Union for Ethical Banking is a United Kingdom consumer organisation campaigning for The Co-operative Bank to maintain and strengthen its ethical standards and return to co-operative ownership in the future. It has also played a part in pressuring the leadership of the bank to implement external auditors for its annual values and ethics report. It has over 10,000 registered supporters among the bank's customers, as well as 1,200 paying members.

== Issues at the bank ==
In the first half of 2013, the Co-operative Bank (then a subsidiary of the Co-operative Group) lost £700m, making the planned expansion of the bank impossible, and raising some warning signs for the bank's customers. Later that year, in May, a £1.5bn "black hole" was found in the bank's accounts. This failing was largely blamed on the bank's chairman, Paul Flowers and the takeover of Britannica Building Society in 2009.

This led to the eventual takeover of the bank by several hedge funds, to plug the financial gap of the bank, which otherwise would have collapsed. In April 2017, the Co-operative group sold off its remaining 20% stake in the bank, marking an end to co-operative ownership. At this time, serious questions were raised by the Save our Bank campaign about its ethical status, with the union saying that the bank 'would not stand a chance' if it did not continue with its ethical policy.

== History of the union ==
The consumer union was born out of the Ethical Consumer Magazine's Save our Bank campaign, which was spun off into a separate co-operative society in 2016, after a successful £30,000 crowdfunding campaign was completed. The union says that becoming a co-operative society will help their members to 'contribute to the debate on how to keep ethics at the heart of financial decision-making at the Co-op Bank'. In 2019, the Customer Union signed a recognition agreement with the bank.

In the future, the union has said that it will hold the Co-operative group to account for the continued implementation of its ethical policy. It also plans in the future to slowly buy a share in the bank, in a bid for an eventual return to co-operative ownership.

== See also ==
- Ethical banking
