= Coventry Building Society =

British building society based in Coventry

- Type: Building society, (mutual)
- Industry: Banking and Financial services
- Founded: 1884; 142 years ago
- Headquarters: Coventry, England, UK
- Number of locations: 56
- Key people: David Thorburn (chairman); Steve Hughes (chief executive)
- Products: Banking, savings and mortgages
- Revenue: ▲£1.09 billion (2025)
- Operating income: ▼£0.80 billion (2025)
- Net income: ▼£0.81 billion (2025)
- Total assets: ▲£88.24 billion (2025)
- Total equity: ▲£4.29 billion (2025)
- Number of employees: ▲5,952 (2025); 3,080 (2024)
- Subsidiaries: The Co-operative Bank
- Website: www.coventrybuildingsociety.co.uk

The Coventry Building Society is a building society based in Coventry, England. It is the second largest in the United Kingdom with total assets of more than £88 billion at 31 December 2025. It is a member of the Building Societies Association. The society has over 1.6 million saver-members and a further 460,000 borrower-members.

== History ==
=== Early history ===
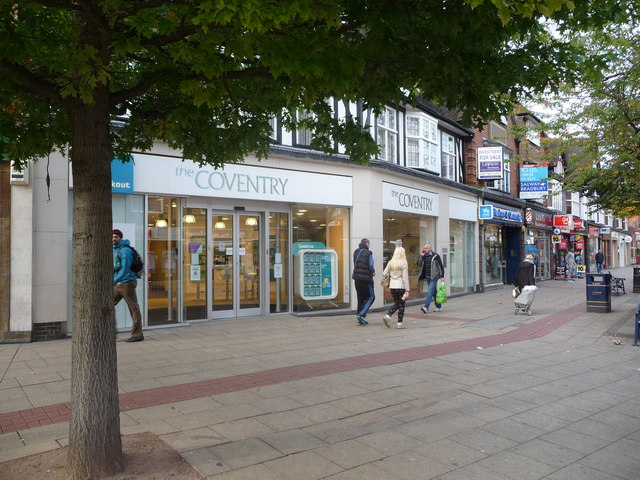
Branch in Solihull

The Coventry Permanent Economic Building Society was formed in 1884, much later than many of the large building societies. It was founded by Thomas Mason Daffern, described as a local bookkeeper. Daffern controlled the society for almost half a century, after which his son took over. Thomas had been appointed Secretary of the Leigh Mills Company in 1876 at the age of 22, a post he held for 20 years. Among the other interests he developed were as a shipping agent, auctioneer and insurance broker, and he later formed a stockbroking partnership. However, the impetus for the formation of the building society was Daffern's position as Secretary of the Coventry 178th Starr-Bowkett Society, an early form of mutual loan society. The terminating nature of the Starr-Bowkett showed the need for a permanent entity and that was the genesis of the Coventry Economic.

When Thomas resigned from Leigh Mills in 1876 he established Daffern & Co to consolidate what was now a wide range of entrepreneurial activities. He continued to run the building society, acting more as proprietor than secretary, paying the society's wages out of his personal remuneration. At the end of its first year the society had 128 members, rising to a peak of 481 in 1892, and staying at that level until the turn of the century. From then until the First World War, Coventry enjoyed substantial economic growth based on the success of the bicycle, car and machine tool industries and by the start of the War membership had risen to 1,900, and assets had risen from £21,000 to £104,000. Membership continued to increase during the war and assets more than doubled.

=== Growth through agencies ===
After the First World War, the Coventry was still a local society in a local market. There was no out-of-town representation and there were no national societies with branches in Coventry. However, from the late 1920s, the national societies began to open offices in Coventry. In response, the society opened branches in Oxford and Solihull. By 1931 the society considered itself number 22 in the industry. In that year Thomas Daffern died, having run the society for 47 years. Control passed to his son Thomas junior, who had been made joint secretary in 1924 with William Heatley, a long-standing assistant to the founder since 1897. The society continued to be run by Daffern & Co staff who still made all the payments. New management brought with it a change in strategy. Having committed itself to new branches in 1928, the emphasis was now firmly behind regional growth through the agency network. Helped by a substantial increase in private housebuilding, membership increased from 15,000 in 1932 to 21,000 in 1939.

=== Change to growth through branches ===
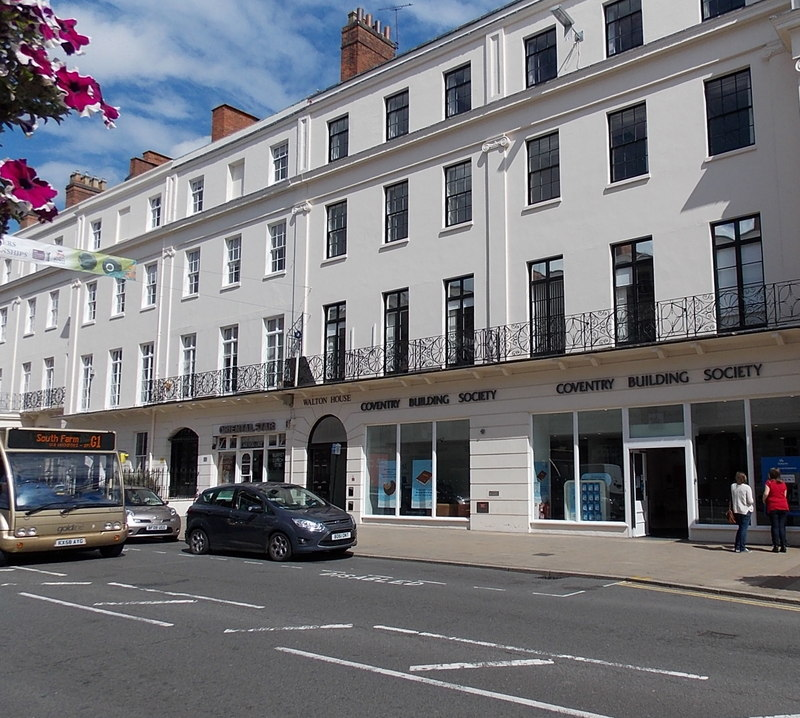
Branch in Leamington Spa

In the early post-war years, the management had continued to strengthen the agency network; the Oxford branch had been a success but not Solihull, which had been leased to estate agents who acted for the society. It was not until 1951 that the anachronistic relationship with Daffern & Co was completely disentangled and the society was running all its own business. Both Daffern junior and Heatley were in their sixties and duly made their exit. Directors were brought in with outside experience, and a coherent strategy established. In 1953 the chairman stressed the need to open branches as the society had been trying to lend nationally but with investment drawn locally. Finally, in 1958 a branch was opened in Nuneaton and then Leicester. From 1960 the Coventry Economic (which had just shortened its name) expanded via branches from Sheffield to Milton Keynes. In that decade, 13 branches were opened followed by a further 28 in the 1970s. There were also three acquisitions: the Coventry & District Permanent Money Society in 1970; the Stourbridge, Lye & District Permanent Building Society in 1976; and the Coventry Provident Building Society in 1983. This latter merger led to a further reduction in the society's name to the Coventry Building Society. Assets grew from £24 million in 1960 to over £500 million in 1983.

=== Society becomes the industry number two ===
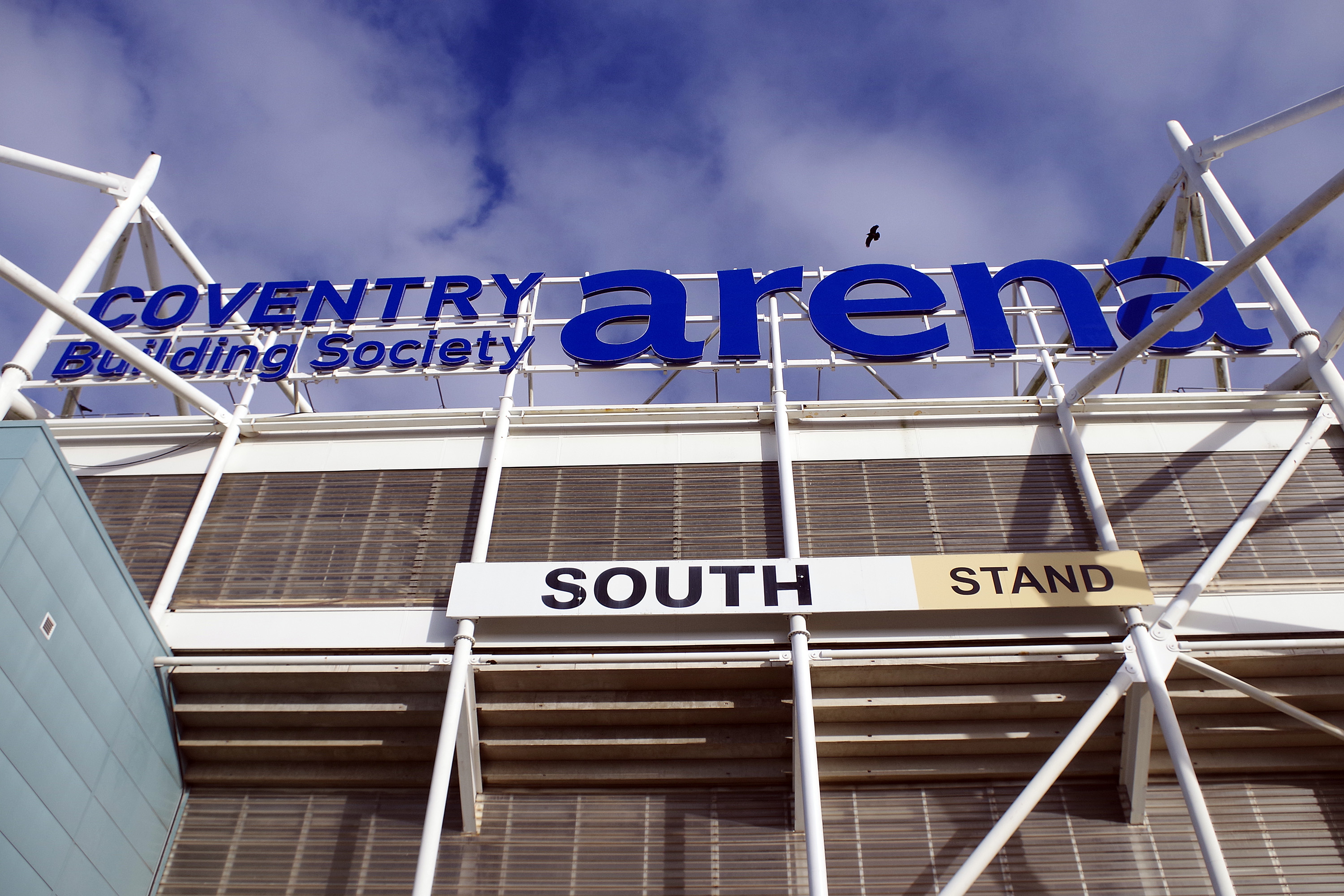
Coventry Building Society Arena in Coventry

Following the merger with the Coventry Provident, there were no more acquisitions for the next 27 years. Organic growth, helped by substantial monetary inflation, took the society's assets to over £18 billion at the end of 2009. One of the features of the society was its resilience in the 2008 financial crisis: it was one of only two societies that was able to access the unsecured long-term wholesale bond market. In 2010 the Coventry acquired the Stroud & Swindon Building Society, then the tenth largest, operating through a branch network of 22 offices and 22 agencies. This added a mortgage book of £3.3 billion, and increased total assets to £22 billion. In the course of the next decade, assets more than doubled, and in 2019 the society, operating out of around 70 branches, had assets of almost £50bn. This made it the second largest building society in the country, a rank it continued to hold in 2022.

In May 2021, the society announced it had agreed a ten-year naming rights deal with Coventry Building Society Arena (formerly Ricoh Arena), a major sports, events and conference venue in the city.

The society achieved B Corp certification in 2023. In December 2023 it was reported that the Coventry was negotiating a potential acquisition of The Co-operative Bank. The purchase was confirmed in May 2024 at a price of £780 million.

== Services ==
The society provides a range of savings products, including regular savings accounts, fixed term bonds and ISAs (Individual savings account), as well as offering a variety of mortgage products to first time buyers, home-movers, remortgage customers and buy to let landlords.

The society was awarded Best Offset Mortgage Lender in the 2016 What Mortgage Awards and Best Lender Website in the 2017 What Mortgage Awards.

The Coventry Building Society is authorised by the Prudential Regulation Authority and regulated by both the Financial Conduct Authority and the Prudential Regulation Authority. It is a member of the Building Societies Association, the Financial Services Compensation Scheme, the UK Payments Council and the UK Cards Association.

== Key people ==
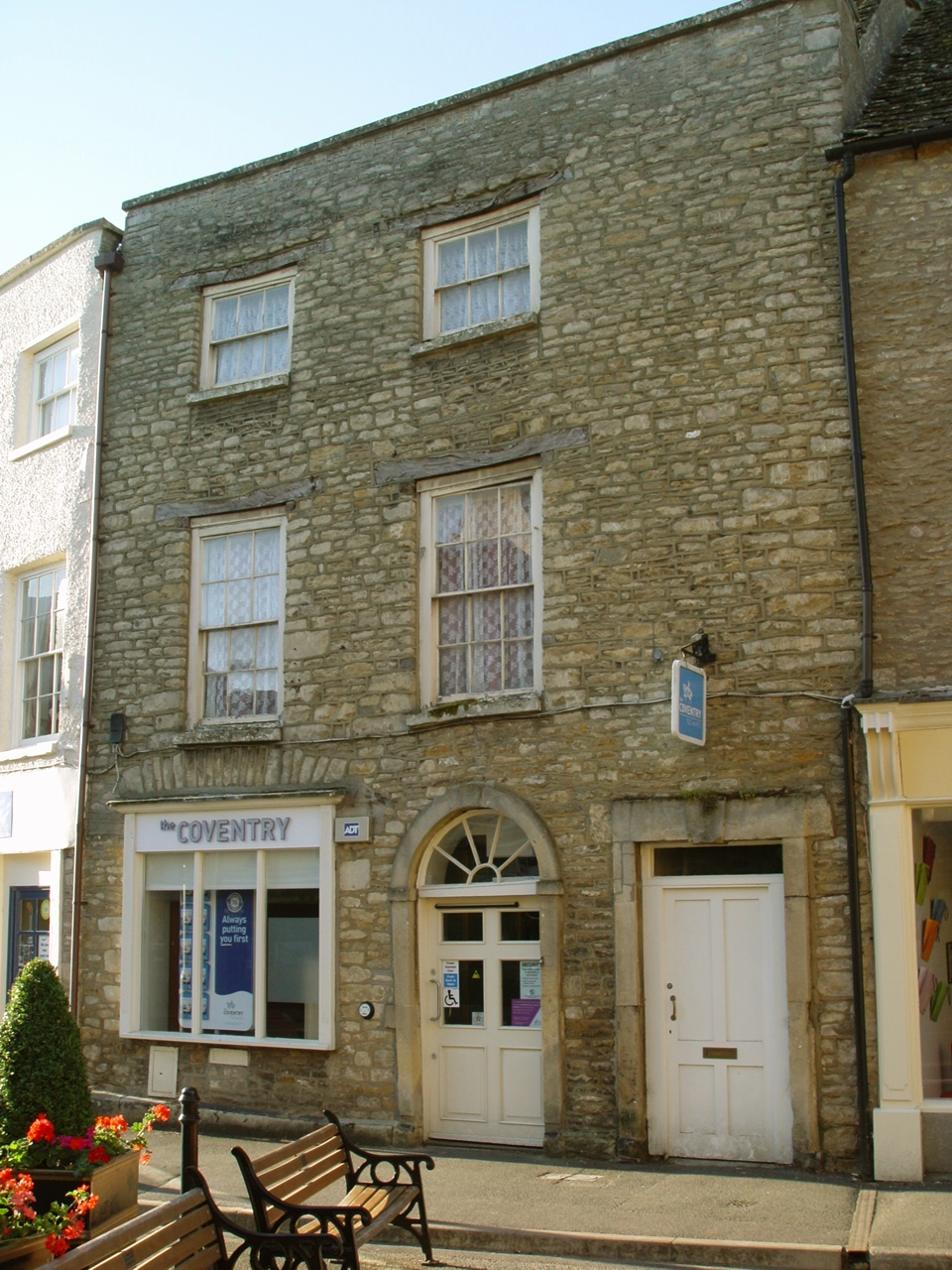
Branch in Tetbury

David Thorburn was appointed as chairman of the board in April 2022. He had previously held various senior roles in British banks, including four years as chairman of Clydesdale Bank.

The current CEO is Steve Hughes, previously CEO of Principality Building Society, and finance director of Lloyds Banking Group’s general insurance business.
