= David Thorburn (banker) =

David Thorburn is a Scottish-born banker who is the chairman of the board at the Coventry Building Society. His earlier roles in British banking include the position of chief executive at Clydesdale Bank and Yorkshire Bank, subsidiaries of the National Australia Bank.

== Education ==
David J. Thorburn was born in Glasgow in 1958, raised in Hamilton, South Lanarkshire and educated at Hamilton Academy, from which he entered the University of Glasgow, graduating in Law. In 1999 he completed an advanced management programme at Harvard Business School, United States.

== Career ==
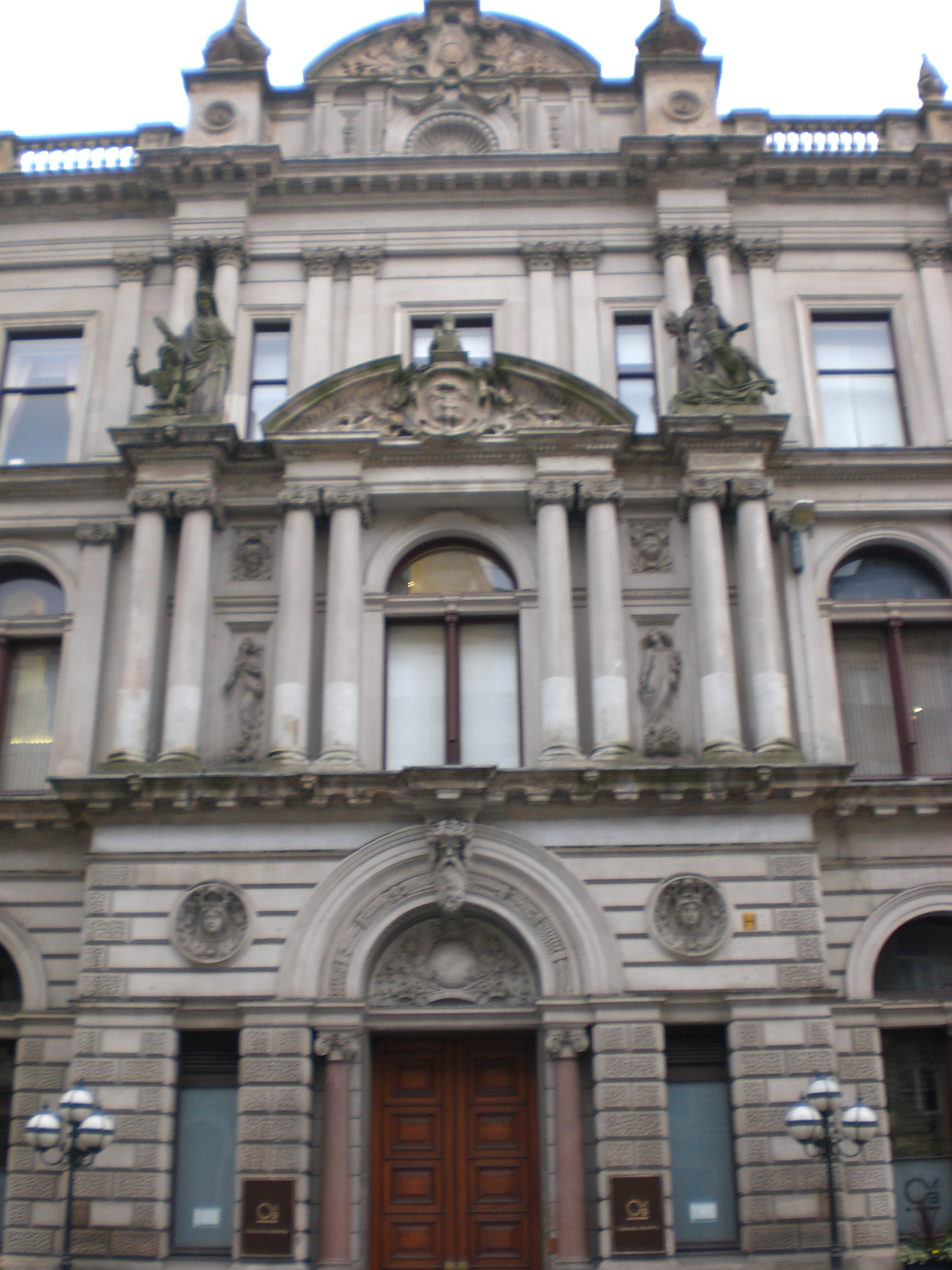
Headquarters of the Clydesdale Bank, Glasgow

Joining the Clydesdale Bank as a trainee graduate in 1978 and moving to the Trustee Savings Bank, Scotland, in 1984, Thorburn returned to the Clydesdale in 1993 as a senior manager.

In April 2002 he joined the executive team at Clydesdale Bank. In 2005, Yorkshire Bank was merged into Clydesdale. Thorburn was appointed as chief executive in 2011, and for a time his signature appeared on Clydesdale banknotes. He stepped down from these posts in January 2015, at a time when the parent National Australia Bank was considering options for exiting the UK.

From July 2015 to March 2018, Thorburn was an independent member of the Bank of England’s Prudential Regulation Committee, stepping down a few months before the end of his three-year term to take up a non-executive directorship at the retail division of Barclays Bank, where he chaired the risk committee. From May 2016, he also sat on the global governance council at the multinational accounting firm Ernst & Young.

He was appointed as chairman of the board at Coventry Building Society, the UK's second largest building society, in April 2022.

== Other appointments ==
David Thorburn is a former vice-chairman and chairman of the Confederation of British Industry in Scotland and a past president of the Chartered Institute of Bankers in Scotland. He is also a former director of Scottish Financial Enterprise and in May 2009 was invited by the First Minister of Scotland to head the team to develop a new Skills Gateway for the financial services industry in Scotland.
