= The Co-operative Bank =

Retail and commercial bank in the United Kingdom

The Co-operative Bank p.l.c.

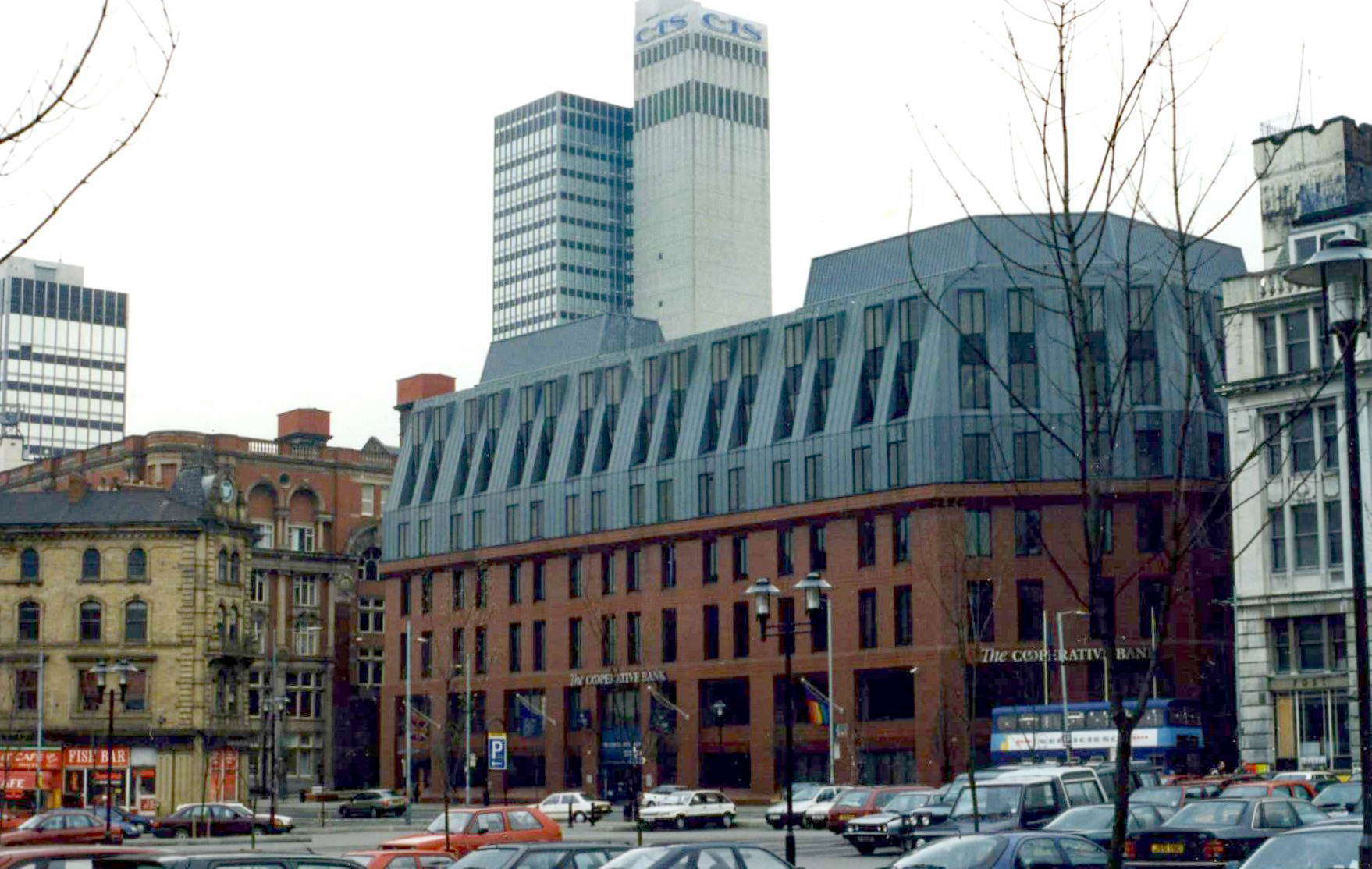
- The bank's headquarters on Balloon Street, Manchester
- Formerly: CWS Loan and Deposit Dept.; Co-operative Bank Limited (1970–1981)
- Type: Public limited company
- Industry: Banking & finance
- Founded: 8 November 1872; 154 years ago; 5 October 1970; 56 years ago (incorporated as Co-operative Bank Limited)
- Headquarters: Manchester, England, UK
- Number of locations: 50 (2024)
- Key people: Andrea Melville (Chief Executive Officer); Bob Dench (Chairman)
- Products: Commercial banking Credit cards Loans; Mortgage loans Retail banking
- Operating income: ▼£71m (2023); £133m (2022)
- Total assets: ▼£26bn (2023); £28bn (2022)
- Owner: Coventry Building Society
- Number of employees: 3,350 (2019)
- Divisions: Smile
- Website: co-operativebank.co.uk

The Co-operative Bank p.l.c. is a British retail and commercial bank based in Manchester, England. Established as a bank for co-operators and co-operatives following the principles of the Rochdale Pioneers, the business evolved in the 20th century into a mid-sized British high street bank, operating throughout the UK mainland. Transactions took place at cash desks in Co-op stores until the 1960s, when the bank set up a small network of branches that grew from six to a high of 160; in 2023 it had 50 branches.

The Co-operative Bank is the only UK high street bank with a customer-led ethical policy which is incorporated into the bank's articles of association. The policy was introduced in 1992 and incorporated into the bank's constitution in 2013, then revised and expanded in 2015 in line with over 320,000 customer responses to a poll.

Despite its name, the bank has never been a cooperative itself. In the 1970s it was registered as a separate plc that was wholly owned by the co-operative society it was part of, in order to achieve its status as a bank among other banks entitled to use inter-banking systems. That society, The Co-operative Group, maintains some relationship with the bank, including managing the licensed use of the Co-operative brand.

In 2013–2014, after a merger with Leek-based Britannia Building Society, a failed attempt to buy a larger rival and a troubled commercial property loan portfolio, the bank was the subject of a rescue plan to address a capital shortfall of about £1.9 billion. The Co-operative Group, which had previously owned the bank outright, became a minority shareholder with a 20% stake. Following restructuring and the formation of a new holding company on 1 September 2017, the Co-operative Group no longer had a stake in the bank and the relationship agreement between the two organisations ended in 2020.

In May 2024, Coventry Building Society agreed to purchase The Co-operative Bank. Regulatory approval was granted in November 2024 and the acquisition completed on 1 January 2025.

== History ==
=== Origins ===
Co-operative Bank Act 1971
- Act of Parliament
- Parliament of the United Kingdom
- Long title: An Act to provide for the transfer to Co-operative Bank Limited of the banking business of Co-operative Wholesale Society Limited; and for other purposes incidental thereto and consequential thereon.
- Citation: 1971 c. xxii

Dates
- Royal assent: 12 May 1971

Text of statute as originally enacted

The bank was formed in 1872 as the Loan and Deposit Department of the Co-operative Wholesale Society, becoming the CWS Bank four years later. However, the bank did not become a registered company until 1971, when the Co-operative Bank Act 1971 (c. xxii) separated the banking business from the Co-operative Wholesale Society. In 1975, the bank became the first new member of the Committee of London Clearing Banks for 40 years and thus able to issue its own cheques.

=== Expansion ===
The bank merged with the Britannia Building Society in 2009, increasing its branch network to 373 branches.

Following the UK government's acquisition of 43.4% of Lloyds Banking Group in 2009, the Co-operative Bank entered into negotiations with Lloyds Banking Group to purchase over 600 of its branches. The purchase was publicly announced in July 2012 and it was revealed that the branches would be initially split from Lloyds under the resurrected TSB brand. On 24 April 2013 the Co-operative Bank announced that it had decided against proceeding with the deal. The reasons given were the poor economic outlook in the UK and an increase in financial regulation requirements. The Financial Times had previously reported that the Co-operative would require a £1 billion increase in capital to support enlarging the bank.

=== 2013 financial crisis ===
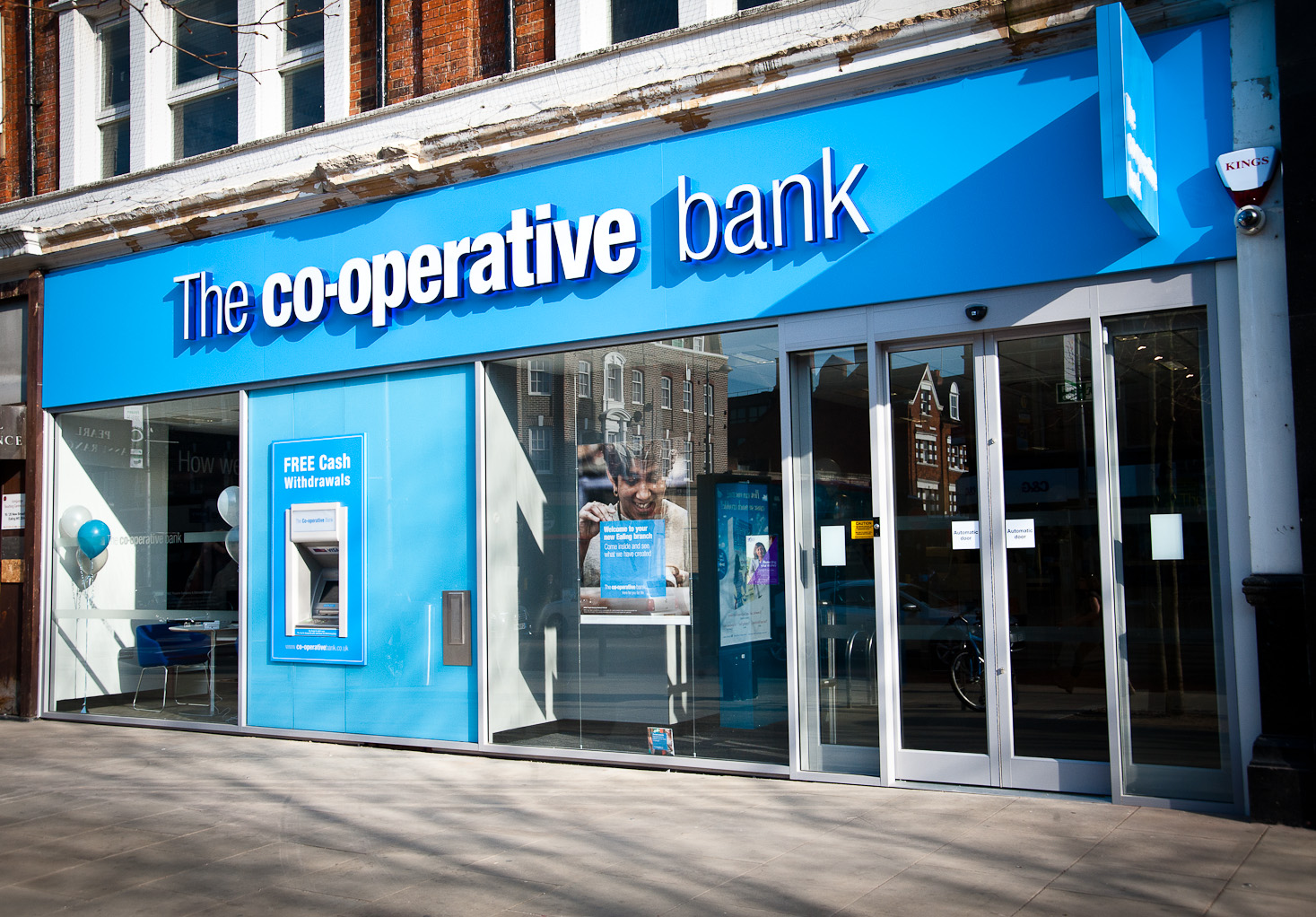
The Co-operative Bank branch in Ealing, West London

In March 2013 the bank reported losses of £600m. In May Moody's downgraded its credit rating by six notches to junk (Ba3) resulting in the chief executive Barry Tootell's resignation.

Over the weekend of 15–16 June 2013 negotiations between the Co-operative Group and its regulator the Prudential Regulation Authority culminated in reports that the bank had a shortfall in its capital of about £1.5 billion, and that this would be filled by a procedure known as a "bail-in" scheme. Bank chairman Paul Flowers resigned shortly before the announcement of the shortfall. A press release by the bank issued on 17 June 2013 explained that the scheme would compel subordinated (also known as junior) bondholders to convert some or all of their assets from debt instruments to ownership ("equity") shares of uncertain value which would be listed on the London Stock Exchange and a new fixed income instrument. The scheme contrasted with the rescues of other British banks in 2008 and 2009 when central government introduced new capital into the failed institutions. Details of the outcome for small retail investors in the bank were uncertain at the time of the June announcement, but there was no suggestion that ordinary deposits in the bank would be put at any additional risk by the rescue, as they would continue to be covered by the existing compensation scheme. The bondholders had the opportunity to seek to reject the restructuring proposed, and an alternative option of the Bank of England taking over the ownership of the bank under the Banking Act 2009 special resolution regime was considered.

In September it was discovered that there was a £3.6bn funding gap between the value the Co-operative Bank placed on its loan portfolio and the actual value it would realise if forced to sell the assets. In October it was reported that the Co-operative Group had been forced to renegotiate the bank's £1.5bn rescue with US hedge funds Aurelius Capital Management, Beach Point Capital Management, and Silver Point Capital that owned its debt. As a result, the group would lose majority control of its banking arm with the proportion of the bank's equity remaining under its ownership dropping to 30%, less than the 75% proposed in the original rescue plan. The plan passed a creditor vote and on 18 December 2013 a judge on the High Court of England and Wales allowed the plan to move forward.

An independent review commissioned by the bank, published in April 2014, concluded that the root of the bank's problems lay in its 2009 takeover of the Britannia Building Society and poor management controls. The bank's auditors, KPMG, were fined £4 million for misconduct shortly after the takeover of Britannia, particularly the valuation of Britannia's commercial loans and other liabilities, by the Financial Reporting Council in 2019.

=== 2014–16 rehabilitation ===
The bank's chief executive at the time, Niall Booker, a former banker at HSBC who nursed HSBC's sub-prime lending business back to health, was appointed in 2013. He attempted to refocus the bank's strategy as a retail and SME lender. At this point, the bank was Britain's seventh biggest lender, and the majority of the bank's revenue was made from interest charges on loans.

Flotation on the London Stock Exchange was planned for 2014 but the plans were abandoned in March 2014 when a rights issue was announced to raise an additional £400 million. In May 2014 the bank finalised the £400 million fundraising plan and obtained shareholder approval, which reduced the Co-operative Group's ownership of the bank to just over 20%.

The Co-operative Bank lost 38,000 current account customers in the first half of 2014 after suffering what it called a "hurricane of negative publicity" following the lender's near collapse. However, this loss was partly offset by 9,700 who switched to the bank – double the number who joined six months earlier, resulting in a net loss of 28,199 customers (around 2% of the bank's total). The rate of loss slowed significantly in 2015, resulting in a loss of 2,250 current account customers between January and August of that year. Overall, between 2014 and 2017, the number of current account holders dropped from 1.5 million to 1.4 million.

Nevertheless, the bank reported progress in its rehabilitation, as its losses sharply narrowed and it strengthened its capital position. Figures released by the bank in August 2014 for the first half of the year showed a pre-tax loss of £75.8 million was identified, compared to £844.6 million for the same period in 2013. Co-op Bank also said its core Tier 1 capital ratio, a key measure of financial strength, stood at 11.5 percent at the end of June and was expected to be significantly above the previous guidance of 10 percent at the end of 2014. However the bank, as expected, was unable to meet the new Bank of England financial stress tests in December 2014.

In late 2014 the bank sold its repossessed properties business for £157.5 million, and its ATM operating business for £35 million. It also outsourced its mortgage servicing operation to Capita, transferring about 660 staff to Capita.

The narrowing of losses was driven largely by a faster-than-expected reduction in unwanted assets, including significant parts of the portfolio of sub-prime mortgages the bank inherited from its merger with Britannia Building Society. Non-core assets reduced by £ billion, and credit impairments improved. In August 2014 the bank said it had cut staff numbers by 21 percent (about 1,560 workers) in the previous year and that there were more job losses to come. The bank had also closed 46 branches, reducing its branch network by 16 percent since the start of 2014. Another 25 would close in the remainder of the year, it said. In August 2015 the bank said that it had closed 62 branches over the previous year, taking the total down to 165. This was partly due to a 28% drop in in-branch transactions resulting from a change in demand from branch to internet banking. By that point staff reductions had exceeded 2,000 workers. After the closure of 54 branches during the first three months of 2016 the bank described its programme of branch closures as "mostly finished". The total number of jobs cut by the bank between 2013 and 2017 was approximately 2,700. The closure of a further 10 branches in the spring of 2017 reduced the branch total to 95, down from nearly 300 at the start of the process.

In December 2014 a Bank of England assessment measured the bank's core capital ratio (a measure of financial strength) at minus 2.6%. As a result, the bank appointed Bank of America Merrill Lynch to help sell £6.6 billion of mortgages.

The bank was not expected to make a full-year profit until 2017 at the earliest. In August 2015 Booker said that he expected the bank would be "part of the consolidation of some of the country’s smaller banks", and that stock-market flotation would remain an option for the future. He said that there had been "no meaningful discussions" concerning the suggestion that the hedge funds which own 80% of the bank's equity were looking at buying up the Co-operative Group's remaining 20% holding.

On 1 April 2016 the bank announced a pre-tax loss for 2015 of £611 million, more than double the loss of £264m for 2014. Booker's salary rose to £3.85m from its 2014 level of £3.1m, an increase of 24.2%. In November 2016 the bank announced a reduction of the workforce to 4,015, a loss of 200 staff.

=== 2017 restructuring, investment and proposed sale ===
In February 2017 the bank's board announced that they were "commencing a sale process" for the bank and were "inviting offers". They said that they were also considering options other than a sale to build capital, including raising cash from new and existing investors. A statement from the Co-operative Group indicated that it supported the decision. In April 2017 the Co-operative Group wrote off its 20% stake in the bank and in May 2017 the bank began seeking a debt-for-equity swap. In June 2017 the bank's board discontinued the formal sale process. By that time the bank's total losses since its financial crisis amounted to £2.6 billion. It was then announced that institutional bondholders had agreed to convert £426 million of bonds into equity, which would give them a 17 per cent stake in the bank. Additionally, it was announced that existing investors had agreed to put £250 million of new equity into a newly established holding company, which would take a 68 per cent stake in the bank. The investors also agreed to add £100 million over 10 years to the bank's pension fund and provide over £200 million of collateral to assist in separating the bank's pension from that of the Co-operative Group. The group was due to own 1 per cent of the bank, with the bank retaining its name and ethical policy. These arrangements were implemented in September 2017 and the final 1% stake held by the group was sold shortly afterwards for £5 million, ending the group's ownership of the bank entirely. The "relationship agreement" between the bank and the group is due to come to an end in 2020. During the uncertainty of the first half of 2017 the bank lost a further 25,000 current account customers. The bank reduced staff numbers by 800 in 2017 and made a pre-tax loss of £174.4 million (the loss for the previous year had been £477.1 million). In February 2018 the bank announced that its remaining branch network would be reduced from 95 to 68 branches during April and May 2018.

=== 2018 onwards: extension of portfolio and growth ===
Andrew Bester joined as the bank's CEO in July 2017, setting out to deliver a plan to enhance the bank's digital capabilities while developing the ethical brand further.

In September 2018 the bank expressed an interest in bidding for part of a £775 million fund designed to help banks develop their business banking services and encourage SME customers to transfer their accounts from RBS Group. The fund was created by RBS as a consequence of its £45 billion government bailout during the 2008 financial crisis. In May 2019, the bank was awarded £15 million by Banking Competition Remedies (BCR) to grow its presence in the business banking market, following its successful application for funding from Pool B of the Capability and Innovation Fund.

=== 2020–2024: contraction ===
By this time, bank was a plc with debt securities listed on the London Stock Exchange. Its equity is not listed. The bank's sole shareholder is the Co-operative Bank Finance plc. The sole shareholder of the Co-operative Bank Finance plc is the Co-operative Bank Holdings Ltd which is a private company limited by share capital. The holding company is owned by hedge funds and other asset management companies.

During the first half of 2020 the bank allocated £11.2m to "loan impairments", giving a loss for that period of £44.6m. In August 2020 the closure was announced of 18 of the bank's remaining 68 branches – to take place by the end of the year – along with an 11% reduction in staff numbers, as a response to a reduction in branch use and historically low interest rates. In 2023, the bank had 50 branches in the UK.

In October 2020, Andrew Bester informed the board of directors of his intention to step down as chief executive officer and as a director of parent company The Co-operative Bank Finance plc. He was replaced as CEO by the bank's CFO, Nick Slape.

As a part of wider turnaround plans, in August 2023 the bank acquired the mortgage accounts of Sainsbury's Bank and in March 2024 announced it would consult staff on a restructure which would reduce staffing by 12%, about 400 staff.

A series of banking entities engaged in talks and offers to acquire the bank, including US private-equity firm Cerberus Capital Management in November 2020, challenger bank Shawbrook in October 2023 A tentative offer was received from the Coventry Building Society which was provisionally accepted in April 2024.

=== 2024 onwards: takeover by Coventry Building Society ===
On 19 April 2024, Coventry Building Society agreed takeover terms for the bank, worth up to £780 million. The deal was subject to the two firms agreeing a contract and gaining approval from financial services regulators. On 24 May 2024, Coventry Building Society finalised its takeover of the bank, and announced that it would not be giving its members a vote on the deal. Regulatory approval was granted in November 2024, and the acquisition was completed on 1 January 2025. As at August 2026, the intention is to transfer all of the Co-operative Bank's business into the Coventry Building Society.

== Membership before financial crisis ==
Despite its name, the Co-operative Bank was not itself a true co-operative as it was not owned directly by its staff, nor customers. Prior to 2013 it was owned by a holding company itself owned by a co-operative – The Co-operative Group. Its customers could, however, choose to become Co-operative Group members and hence indirectly acquire an ownership interest in the bank, earning dividends on their account holdings and borrowing with the Bank.

The bank also had approximately 2,500 preference shareholders, which were irredeemable fixed-interest shares. These shareholders could attend the bank's general meetings, but only had speaking and voting rights if the dividend is in arrears, or on any resolution varying their rights or winding up the bank.

Unlike other co-operative banks, such as the Dutch company Rabobank, the Co-operative Bank did not have a federal structure of local banks, instead being a single national bank.

== Customer Union for Ethical Banking ==
In October 2013, around the time of the takeover, a group of customers, supported by Ethical Consumer magazine, launched a Save our Bank campaign, to keep the bank adhering to its ethical policy and eventually bring it back into co-operative ownership. 10,000 people signed up to the campaign. In 2016 the campaign became the Customer Union for Ethical Banking, a formal co-operative, which retained the Save our Bank name on its website. The union now has 1,200 members who all pay a small yearly membership fee. In 2019, the bank committed to ongoing engagement with the customer union, through a formal recognition agreement.

== Ethical policy ==
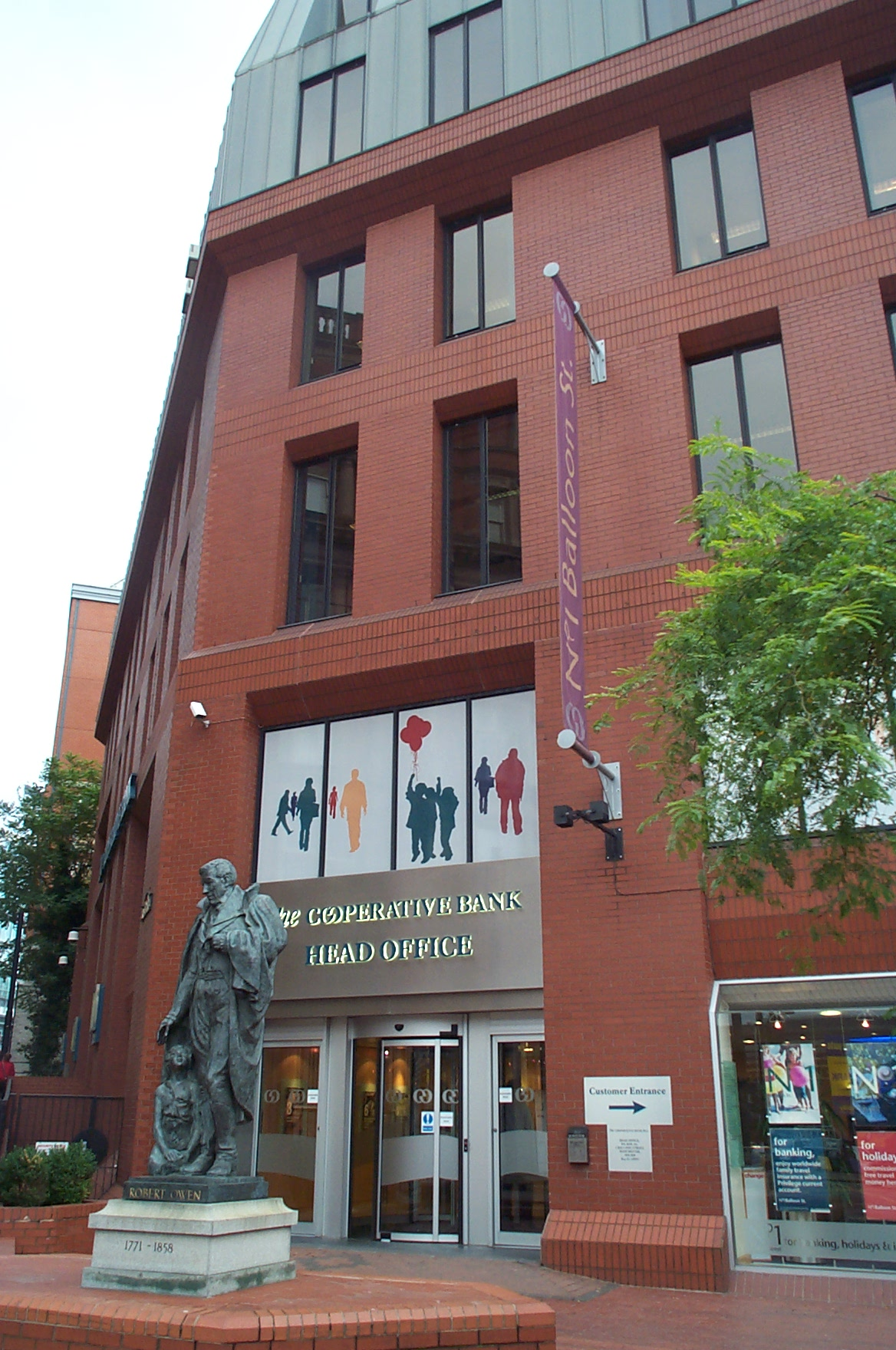
A statue of co-operative pioneer Robert Owen stands in front of the bank's head office in Manchester.

The Co-operative Bank publishes an Ethical Policy and has an ethical code of conduct as part of its constitution. The Ethical Policy is overseen by a values and ethics committee chaired by an independent director. The policy prohibits the provision of any banking services to businesses or organisations that take part in certain business activities or sectors. This includes a commitment not to finance "the manufacture or transfer of armaments to oppressive regimes" or "any business whose core activity contributes to global climate change, via the extraction or production of fossil fuels". In 2013, the bank estimated that it had declined finance requests totalling in excess of £1bn since the policy was introduced in 1992. The policy is based on a regularly renewed customer mandate in the form of a survey. In the 2005/06 financial year, whilst making profits of £96.5 million, it turned away business of nearly £10 million.

The Ethical Policy only applies to the activities of the Co-operative Bank and not to other Co-operative Group businesses such as Co-operative Asset Management, the group's asset management business. Nevertheless, this business received criticism in 2009 for not following the bank's Ethical Policy and in 2013 it was sold to the Royal London Group.

In June 2005, the bank closed the account of Christian Voice, a Christian evangelical group, because of its standpoint on homosexuality, specifically the group's "discriminatory pronouncements on grounds of sexual orientation". They said the group was "incompatible with the position of the Co-operative Bank, which publicly supports diversity and dignity". Christian Voice said the bank was discriminating against it on religious grounds. Gay Times subsequently selected the Co-operative Bank for its Ethical Corporate Stance Award.

In late 2014 the bank undertook an advertising campaign to promote its Ethical Policy. The Co-operative Bank brand subsequently came top in YouGov's survey of the most improved brands of 2015.

The most recent revision of the policy took place in June 2022, following customer polling in 2021.

=== Charity and community ===
The bank's partnership with youth homelessness charity, Centrepoint, continued during 2018 and raised over £1m, helping to fund a national helpline for Centrepoint, and a specialist helpline service based in Manchester.

In 2018, the bank partnered with charity Refuge and successfully lobbied for the launch of a new banking industry code of practice for customers affected by financial abuse.

== Divisions ==
=== Smile ===
The bank launched a separate Internet-only operation known as Smile in 1999, offering current accounts and savings products. As of January 2026, Smile's website is no longer accepting new account applications and is directing customers to its parent instead.

=== Britannia ===
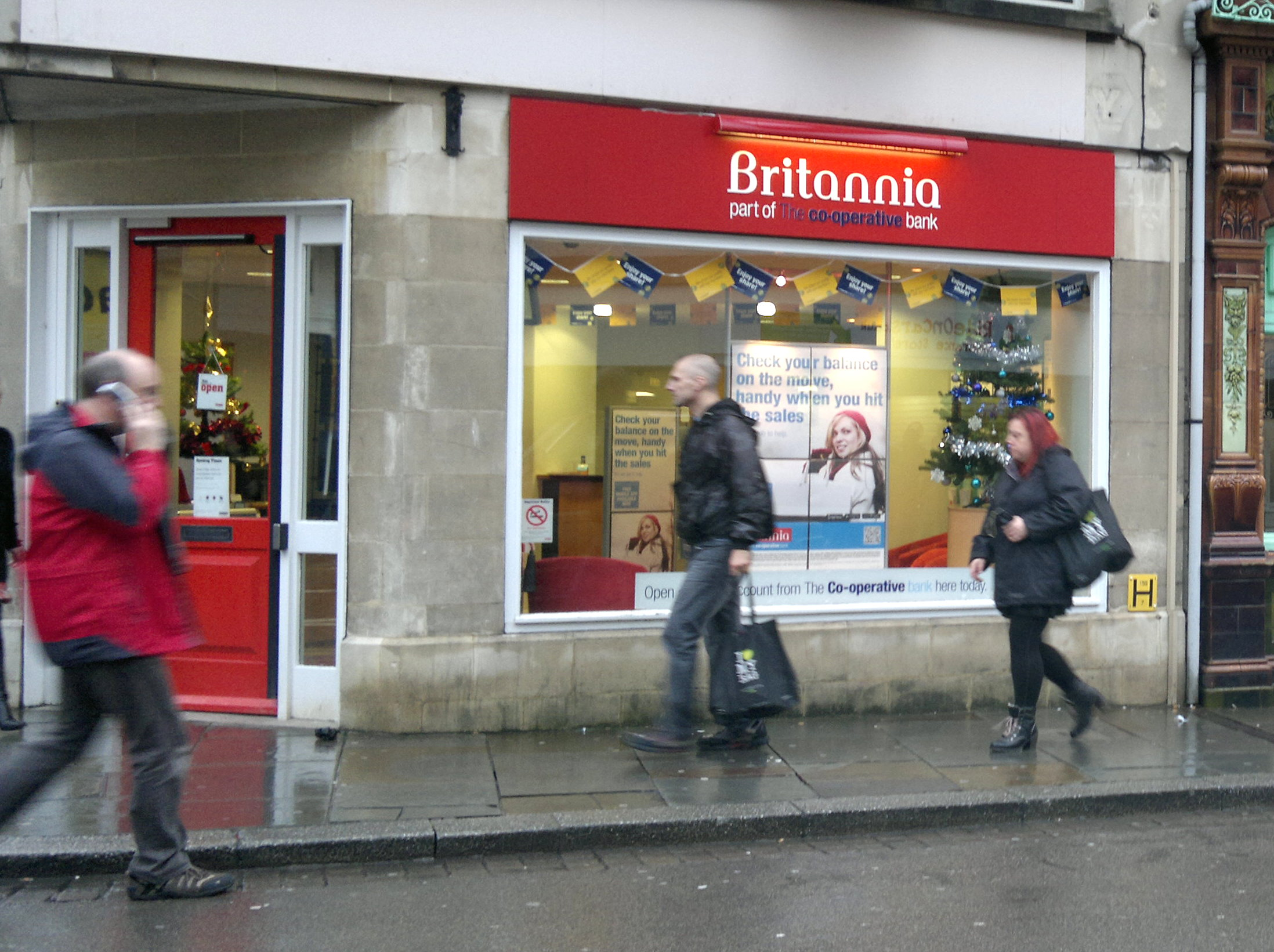
A former high-street branch of the Britannia in Gloucester, that has since closed

In October 2008, it was reported that Co-operative Financial Services was in talks with Britannia Building Society with a view to sharing facilities and possibly a full merger. Such a venture was facilitated by the passing of the Building Societies (Funding) and Mutual Societies (Transfers) Act 2007, although further secondary legislation was required before such a merger could take place. On 21 January 2009, Co-operative Financial Services and Britannia Building Society agreed to a merger, with the new "super-mutual" being brought under the stewardship of The Co-operative Group. The proposed merger was subject to a vote by Britannia's members at their AGM, and on 29 April 2009 the members voted overwhelmingly in favour of the merger. Neville Richardson, Britannia CEO, became chief executive of the combined business.

In the short term, both Britannia Building Society and the Co-operative Bank continued operating their own products, branch networks and systems. All Britannia branches were due to be rebranded under the Co-operative name by the end of 2013, but this was abandoned after the financial crisis, with a great many simply closing and only a smaller number being retained and converted.

In June 2013, a member of the Treasury Select Committee criticised Richardson – who had left the bank in 2011 – over his role in the merger. In 2014, an independent review reported that the problems faced by both companies had been exacerbated by the merger. In the same year the Deputy Governor of the Bank of England, Andrew Bailey, told the Treasury Select Committee that the Britannia Building Society would have collapsed if it had not been taken over by the Co-operative Bank.

== Technical problems ==
In 2009, the Co-operative Bank received considerable public criticism from business customers for problems with the bank's business internet banking service. It subsequently emerged that the service crashed when more than 130 users logged on simultaneously, and some business customers were left unable to access their accounts for days.

In 2011, some Co-operative Bank customers were left temporarily unable to use their debit cards as a result of IT problems.

== Controversies ==
On 17 November 2013, Labour Party advisor and the former Co-operative Bank chairman, Rev. Paul Flowers, was caught buying crack cocaine and methamphetamine. The former Labour councillor served as the bank's chairman from April 2010 until June 2013 and it was under his chairmanship that in March 2013 the bank reported losses of £600 million; in May 2013, Moody's had downgraded its credit rating by six notches to junk (Ba3) and the chief executive Barry Tootell resigned. Flowers was suspended by both the Labour Party and the Methodist Church. On 19 November it was discovered that Flowers had previously resigned as a Labour Party Councillor for Bradford Council after "inappropriate" content was discovered on his computer.

On 19 November 2013, the group's chairman Len Wardle, who was leading the board when Flowers was appointed to his position, resigned "with immediate effect" because of the Flowers scandal.

== See also ==
- The Co-operative Credit Union
- Co-operative Permanent Building Society
- Customer Union for Ethical Banking
- List of European cooperative banks
