= Paul Flowers (banker) =

British businessman

- Born: Paul John Flowers; 5 June 1950 (age 76); Portsmouth, Hampshire, England
- Other name: The Crystal Methodist
- Occupation: Retired
- Years active: 1975–present
- Organization: The Co-operative Group
- Title: Non-executive chairman, The Co-operative Bank (2009–13)

Paul John Flowers FRSA FRGS (born 5 June 1950) is an English businessman and former Methodist minister. He is a former Labour councillor in Rochdale and Bradford, and was Non-executive chairman of the Co-operative Bank.

After the bank lost £700m in the first half of 2013, and a £1.5 billion hole in the bank's finances was discovered by the new chief executive Euan Sutherland in May 2013, Flowers resigned in May 2013.

In November 2013, the activities of Flowers, who had occupied a variety of powerful political and business posts and had been appointed by Labour leader Ed Miliband to a senior post in 2010, were widely reported in the media. Flowers was filmed by an acquaintance in his car apparently agreeing to buy cocaine and methamphetamine, and appearing to count large sums of money while discussing his use of a range of other non-medicinal drugs. He was subsequently taken to court and convicted of possession of drugs.

Soon after the film of the apparent purchase of illicit drugs was released to the media, it was revealed that, while deputy head of social services at Rochdale Council, Flowers had known about the activities of paedophiles at a residential boys' school, but had not informed parents or taken measures to close the school. Flowers was also responsible for rejecting allegations of child sex abuse against the late Rochdale MP Cyril Smith, and while working at Bradford Council in 2011, "inappropriate but not illegal adult content was found on a council computer handed in by Councillor Flowers for servicing. This was put to him and he resigned immediately."

Several newspapers reported allegations that he communicated with male sex workers using his work email account while he was in charge of the Co-operative Bank, and was convicted of carrying out a sex act in a public toilet more than 30 years ago. In February 2025, Flowers was jailed for three years for fraud.

== Early life ==
Flowers was born in Portsmouth and brought up in Eastleigh, going to Barton Peveril School. From 1972 he studied for a Bachelor of Arts degree in theology, graduating from the University of Bristol in 1975. He then obtained a post-graduate diploma at the University of Geneva. Early in his career he worked for four years in banking, gaining part 1 and half of his part 2 Institute of Bankers qualification.

== Methodist minister ==
Flowers was a Methodist minister for over 40 years. In 1976 he was appointed to serve the church in Bradford, West Yorkshire. From 1978 to 1981 he was a minister at Hedge End's Methodist church in Eastleigh. After periods in Coventry, Rochdale and Bridlington, he returned to Bradford. Flowers was a minister at Clayton and Wibsey churches in the Bradford South Circuit near his home in Bradford. Flowers was a trustee for Methodist Church Purposes, the body which manages the church's invested funds and property. Flowers contributed regularly to the Methodist Recorder, including a spell as the paper's art critic, writing the Gallery Notes column. In 2000 he attempted to set up a trade union for clergy to protect members against false allegations of abuse.

On 21 November 2013 he was suspended indefinitely by the church. In early summer 2014 he left Bradford to live in Greater Manchester. He ceased to be in 'Full Connexion' (that is, on the list of authorised ministers) with the Methodist Church of Great Britain in January 2017, following the conclusion of a disciplinary process which found him guilty of 'seriously impairing the mission, witness or integrity of the church'.

== Co-operative Group ==
Flowers' career progressed through the democratic structures of United Co-operatives, becoming a member of its board following election via United's Yorkshire Regional Committee. In 2008, following United's merger with The Co-operative Group in 2007, he joined the board of the Co-op Group, and was later made its deputy chairman. He resigned from the Group board and all subsidiary positions in June 2013, after his enforced resignation from Co-op Bank that month.

=== Co-operative Bank ===
In 2009, following its merger with Britannia Building Society, Flowers was appointed non-executive chairman of the Co-operative Bank. On 26 March 2010 he was appointed non-executive chairman of Co-operative Financial Services; the holding company for both the Co-operative Bank and the Co-operative Insurance Society. During this period, he was made a fellow of the Chartered Institute of Bankers in Scotland; in light of the later scandal, the fellowship was withdrawn on 21 November 2013.

After the bank lost £700m in the first half of 2013, and then the discovery of a £1.5bn hole in the bank's finances by new chief executive Euan Sutherland in May 2013, Flowers resigned from the bank in June 2013, taking responsibility for the difficulties the bank experienced after acquiring Britannia. He was replaced by Richard Pym, head of UK Asset Resolution.

Flowers testified to the Treasury Select Committee in November 2013 that the Britannia merger and other deals were undertaken under pressure from senior government ministers.

In March 2018 Flowers was banned from the financial services industry by the Financial Conduct Authority (FCA) for having used his work email for sexually explicit messages and to discuss illegal drugs, and his work mobile phone to call premium rate chat lines. The FCA said he had "demonstrated a lack of fitness and propriety required to work in financial services" and consumers would lose faith in the industry if he was allowed to continue in it.

== Labour Party ==
In the 1970s Flowers was vice-chairman of Eastleigh Labour Party, and contested Bishop's Waltham in Hampshire county council elections in 1981.

Flowers unsuccessfully stood for selection in 1985 as the Labour candidate to contest the Coventry South East parliamentary seat, supported by branches of his union as a former bank worker, the General, Municipal, Boilermakers and Allied Trade Union. He described himself as "towards the centre" politically in this campaign.

In the Rochdale council election of 1988 he gained a seat in the Smallbridge and Wardleworth ward, holding it until 1992. Flowers was vice-chairman of Rochdale Council's social services committee at the time of a Satanic abuse scandal, and was responsible for rejecting allegations of child sex abuse against the late MP Cyril Smith.

He then moved to Bradford, serving for 10 years on the city council. He resigned his seat in Great Horton in September 2011, because of his "increased responsibilities as Co-op Bank's chairman." In light of the 2013 drugs scandal, Bradford City Council revealed that, in 2011, "Inappropriate but not illegal adult content was found on a council computer handed in by Councillor Flowers for servicing. This was put to him and he resigned immediately."

In 2010 he was appointed by new Labour Party leader Ed Miliband to the party's finance and industry advisory board. On 6 March 2013 as part of his membership of the group, Labour leader Ed Miliband met Flowers to discuss UK banking reform.

Flowers had told MPs on the Banking Committee that he had helped to arrange a donation to then-shadow chancellor Ed Balls's office although Balls insisted that Flowers had nothing to do with the donation. The scandal surrounding the revelations led the Conservative Party chairman, Grant Shapps to ask the Labour leadership to disclose details of any private meetings with Flowers and to return a £50,000 donation to Ed Balls's office that Flowers had backed.

== Other works ==
Flowers has been involved with a large number of charities, including being a trustee of both the Terrence Higgins Trust and, between 1992 and 2004, the Lifeline project, which worked in the field of alcohol and drug abuse. Following the scandal of November 2013, the Lifeline project stated that at the time of his resignation he was under investigation following alleged submission of false expenses claims, with the matter having then been referred to the Charity Commission.

In the 1980s he was vice-chairman of the West Midlands Citizens Advice Bureau. Flowers has been a member of the Advertising Standards Authority, and was vice chair of the National Association of Citizens Advice Bureau.

Flowers was also a chair of Manchester Camerata (the city's chamber orchestra) between 2012 and 2013.

He is a fellow of both the Royal Society of Arts and the Royal Geographical Society.

He was a former art critic for the Methodist Recorder, writing the Gallery Notes column.

== Drugs scandal ==
A few days after his appearance before the Treasury Select Committee, Flowers was filmed by acquaintance Stuart Davies in his car apparently agreeing to buy cocaine and methamphetamine. The clip appears to show him counting out £300 in £20 notes, before sending a friend to make the deal. Whilst waiting, Flowers discusses his use of ketamine, cannabis and GHB. Davies handed over the footage to the Mail on Sunday, which published its article on 17 November 2013. On 21 November it emerged that Flowers had been convicted of drunk-driving in Manchester in 1990.

Flowers was immediately suspended by the Methodist Church for three weeks (later extended to indefinite suspension) pending further investigation, and suspended as a member of the Labour Party. Flowers in a statement said:

This year has been incredibly difficult, with a death in the family and the pressures of my role with the Co-operative Bank. At the lowest point in this terrible period, I did things that were stupid and wrong. I am sorry for this, and I am seeking professional help, and apologise to all I have hurt or failed by my actions

Co-operative Group chairman Len Wardle, who had been part of the committee which had selected Flowers and was scheduled to retire in May 2014, resigned in light of the revelations. He was replaced by Ursula Lidbetter, Co-op Group's deputy chair and chief executive of the Lincolnshire Co-operative Society.

David Cameron announced in the House of Commons that he would be setting up inquiries to determine how Flowers had come to be appointed chairman of the Co-op Bank.

On 21 November 2013, Flowers was arrested by police in the Merseyside area in connection with a drugs supply investigation. He has been dubbed the "crystal methodist". In April 2014 he was charged with possession of drugs, and convicted of possessing cocaine, methamphetamine and ketamine on 7 May 2014, receiving a £400 fine.

== Fraud conviction ==
In 2023 Flowers was charged with fraud by Greater Manchester Police in relation to his actions as the executor of the Last Will and Testament of a Margaret Mary Jarvis. Flowers was accused of committing fraud by abusing his position between June 2016 and October 2017. He was bailed in December 2023. On 27 February 2025, Flowers was jailed for three years, after he admitted to defrauding Margaret Jarvis, a vulnerable friend suffering from dementia who had trusted him with power of attorney, out of nearly £100,000 over a two-year period from 2015 to 2017.
