= NatWest Holdings =

British retail bank holding company

NatWest Holdings Limited
- Formerly: RFB Holdco Limited (April–December 2016)
- Type: Subsidiary
- Industry: Retail Banking
- Founded: 2016; 10 years ago
- Headquarters: London, England, UK
- Key people: Richard Haythornthwaite (Chairman); Paul Thwaite (Chief Executive)
- Parent: NatWest Group

NatWest Holdings Limited is an intermediate holding company for the NatWest Group's retail banking interests in the United Kingdom.

The company was established in 2016, as part of a structural reform intended to comply with the requirements of the Financial Services (Banking Reform) Act 2013. The Act implements the Independent Commission on Banking recommendation that core domestic operations should be "ring-fenced" from wholesale and investment banking activities by 2019.

== Operations ==
Registered in England, NatWest Holdings was formed to be the direct parent of five licensed banks:

Bank	Area of operation
NatWest	England, Wales, western Europe
Royal Bank of Scotland	Scotland
Ulster Bank	Northern Ireland
Coutts	United Kingdom

Coutts & Co. is a wholly owned subsidiary of NatWest. NatWest Holdings includes the Lombard North Central asset finance business and RBS Invoice Finance (Holdings).

As authorised brands of Royal Bank of Scotland, the ring-fenced group also covers Messrs. Drummond and Holt's Military Banking, the only remaining branches of RBS operating in England and Wales. Child & Co. and the banking and lending business of Adam and Company closed in 2022.

On 19 February 2021, NatWest Group announced a phased withdrawal of all banking activity and associated services within the Republic of Ireland. On 3 May 2021, the business of Ulster Bank in Northern Ireland was transferred to NatWest as part of a court-approved Banking Business Transfer Scheme. Previously a wholly owned subsidiary of NatWest, it continues to operate under its own name.

== Non ring-fenced entities ==
Two other licensed banks within the NatWest Group – NatWest Markets (created at the same time) and Royal Bank of Scotland International (incorporating NatWest International, Coutts Crown Dependencies and Isle of Man Bank) – sit outside the ring-fence. RBS International, NatWest Trustee and Depositary Services, RBS International Funds Services S.A. and Coutts & Co. (Cayman) are wholly owned subsidiaries of The Royal Bank of Scotland International (Holdings).

In 2022, NatWest Group announced the creation of Commercial and Institutional, which brought together the Commercial, NatWest Markets and RBS International customer businesses as a new operating segment.
