= 2012 RBS Group computer system problems =

Royal Bank of Scotland technical issues

The 2012 RBS computer system problems were technical issues affecting computers run by the Royal Bank of Scotland Group (now NatWest Group), including National Westminster Bank, The Royal Bank of Scotland and Ulster Bank, which began on 19 June 2012.

In 2014, RBS was fined £42m over the incident.

== Cause ==
A software update was applied on 19 June 2012 to RBS's CA-7 software which controls its payment processing system. It later emerged that the update was corrupted by RBS technical staff. Customers' wages, payments and other transactions were disrupted. Some customers were unable to withdraw cash using ATMs or to see bank account details. Others faced fines for late payment of bills because the system could not process direct debits.

Stephen Hester, CEO of the RBS Group, said that the problem was caused by a software upgrade. Unite union leaders criticised Hester's management of the episode, but Hester denied that the outsourcing of IT services to India was a factor in the problem, saying that the bank's IT services were mostly based in Edinburgh. A spokesman for the RBS Group said that the problem had occurred in the UK.

== Impact ==
Completions of new home purchases were delayed, and some people were stranded abroad. Another account holder was threatened with the discontinuation of their life support machine in a Mexican hospital, and one man was held in prison. As a result of the error, RBS and NatWest announced that over 1,200 of their busiest branches would extend their hours throughout the week, including the bank's first Sunday opening, to enable affected customers to access cash. On Monday 25 June, over 1,000 branches opened for extended hours, and the number of phone staff was doubled to deal with customer queries.

On 26 June, RBS admitted that some transactions were still affected by the problem. Ulster Bank said on Wednesday 27 June that it did not expect full services to be restored until the start of the following week, but that it hoped that the automatic payments backlog would be cleared by the weekend.

On 3 July RBS admitted that some RBS and NatWest personal loan borrowers had accidentally been charged twice and newspapers advised RBS customers to check their balances.

Customers of Ulster Bank were still having problems accessing cash on 2 July and the bank admitted that they did not know when customers would be able to access cash. RBS denied that the delays with Ulster Bank meant that customers in Ireland meant less to them, saying that Ulster Bank payments followed those of NatWest and RBS. This was a result of the way the computers were set up when the three banks were merged. Monthly payments of social welfare to 48,000 Ulster Bank customers in the Republic of Ireland due on 3 July would be added to the existing backlog.

RBS said on 4 July that the vast majority of Ulster Bank customers would have normal services restored by 16 July 2012.

On 5 July the Ulster Bank CEO Jim Brown agreed to waive his annual bonus in response to the crisis.

== Reaction ==
=== United Kingdom ===
The Financial Services Authority asked other banks to treat customers of RBS fairly and also demanded a complete account of the problem. Lord Oakeshott called for the bank to be broken up. Sir Mervyn King, Governor of the Bank of England, called for a full investigation by the Financial Services Authority and told the Treasury Select Committee that he had been in very close contact with senior RBS staff over the weekend. The Shadow Chief Secretary to the Treasury, Rachel Reeves, said that it was "absolutely imperative" that the bank got the situation under control.

=== Ireland ===
The Taoiseach, Enda Kenny, and Minister for Social Protection, Joan Burton, criticised Ulster Bank for the situation which affected 30,000 social welfare recipients. Senator Lorraine Higgins called the situation a "fiasco" and said Ulster Bank should ensure that customers credit ratings were not affected, which Ulster Bank replied it would. The Irish Bank Officials' Association said that an agreement had been made that overtime would be voluntary and that Ulster Bank workers would be paid appropriately for extra work.

The Irish Payment Services Organisation advised customers to keep records of how they were affected and to contact the Financial Services Ombudsman if they were not satisfied. There was press criticism of Ulster Bank's perceived downplaying of the issue in the early stages.

The Consumers' Association of Ireland said it had received thousands of complaints from Ulster Bank customers. The Oireachtas Committee on Finance called on representatives of the Central Bank of Ireland to appear before it on 4 July and management of Ulster Bank to do the same on 5 July.

=== RBS statements ===
On the first Monday after the start of the problems, RBS said that their computers were operating normally, but that Stephen Hester had sent a senior colleague to Dublin to deal with the situation in Ulster Bank. On the same day, some customers still could not see up-to-date account details.

On 27 June RBS announced that it had cancelled its corporate hospitality at Wimbledon as it would be inappropriate under the circumstances.
