= Bó (bank) =

2019–2020 British banking brand

- Type: Trading division
- Industry: Banking
- Founded: 27 November 2019
- Defunct: 1 May 2020
- Services: Retail banking
- Parent: National Westminster Bank
- Website: wearebo.co.uk

Bó was a banking brand that operated in the United Kingdom between November 2019 and May 2020. Bó operated as a trading division of National Westminster Bank, part of the Royal Bank of Scotland Group, later renamed NatWest Group.

== History ==
In March 2018, it was revealed that the then Royal Bank of Scotland Group were planning to establish a digital banking brand to rival services offered by newly established and tech-focused challenger banks. The name of the new banking brand, Bó, was announced in September 2018.

Bó was launched to the public on 27 November 2019, following a period of beta testing by RBS Group employees. The development of Bó was estimated as costing £100 million. Bó did not offer overdraft facilities or the ability to open joint accounts.

The chief executive officer of Bó, Mark Bailie, announced that he would be leaving the bank in 2020.

On 1 May 2020, it was announced that Bó would close, and its 11,413 customers were given 60 days to withdraw their money. Staff working for Bó would be transferred to NatWest's Mettle business banking division.

== Branding ==
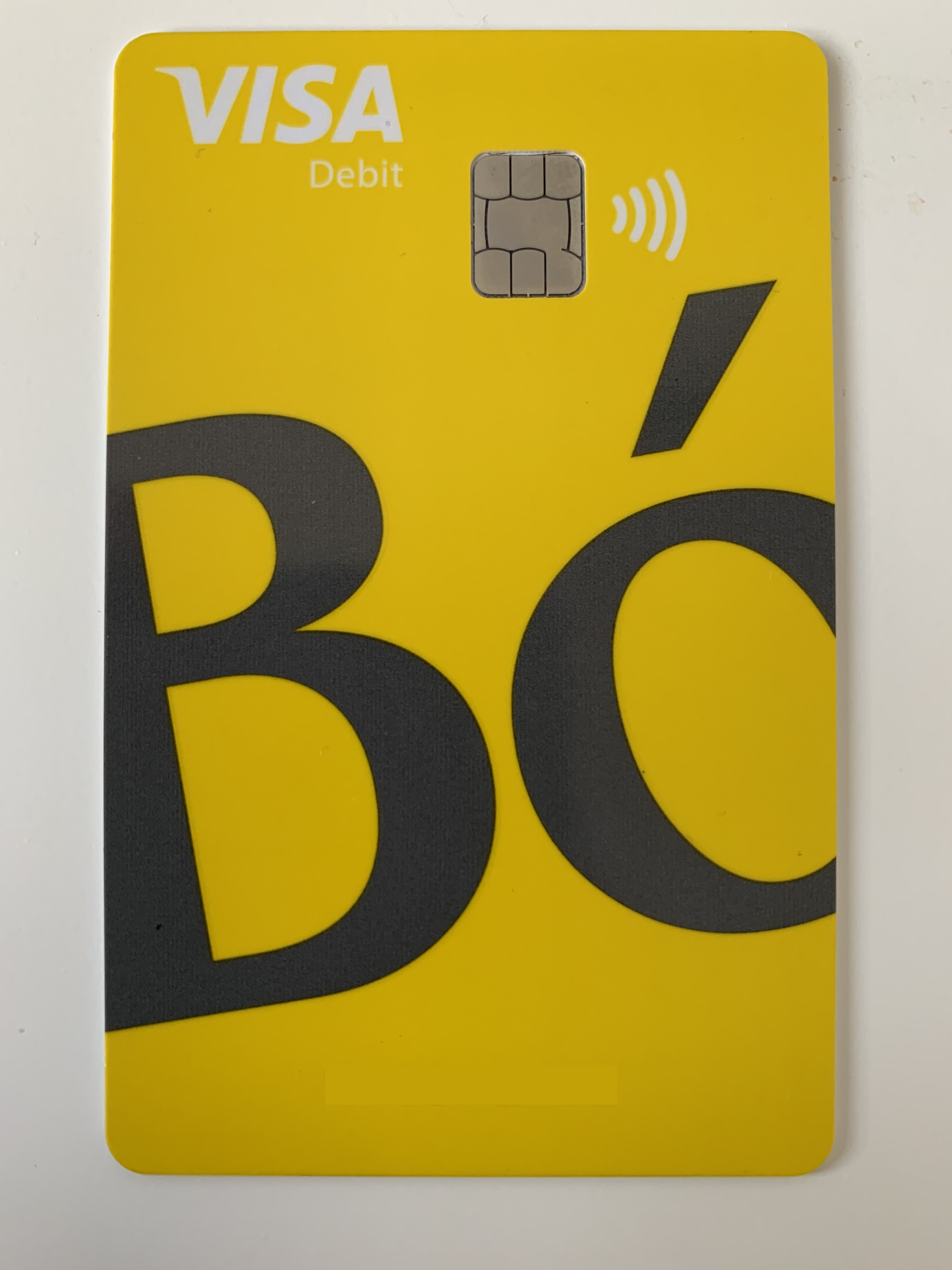
Bó Visa debit card

The Bó brand was developed by Accenture Interactive. The name Bó was described as having no meaning in the English language but it has been reported that the word means "cow" in Irish and "to live" in Danish. Bó used the marketing slogan "Do Money Better".

Debit cards were yellow and in the portrait orientation on the front side, showing only the bank name and customer name. The card number, sort code and account number, expiration dates and CVC codes were printed on the reverse side.

== See also ==
- List of banks in the United Kingdom
