= RBS International =

International banking arm of NatWest Group

The Royal Bank of Scotland International Limited
- Company type: Subsidiary
- Industry: Financial services
- Founded: 1996; 30 years ago
- Headquarters: St Helier, Jersey
- Key people: Jane Howard (chief executive)
- Products: Offshore banking
- Number of employees: 1,750 (August 2011 est.)
- Parent: NatWest Group
- Website: rbsinternational.com natwestinternational.com

The Royal Bank of Scotland International Limited, trading under the NatWest International (retail), RBS International (institutional), Coutts Crown Dependencies (wealth management) and Isle of Man Bank brands, is the offshore banking arm of NatWest Group. It provides a range of services to personal, business, commercial, corporate and financial intermediary customers from its base in St. Helier, Jersey.

== History ==
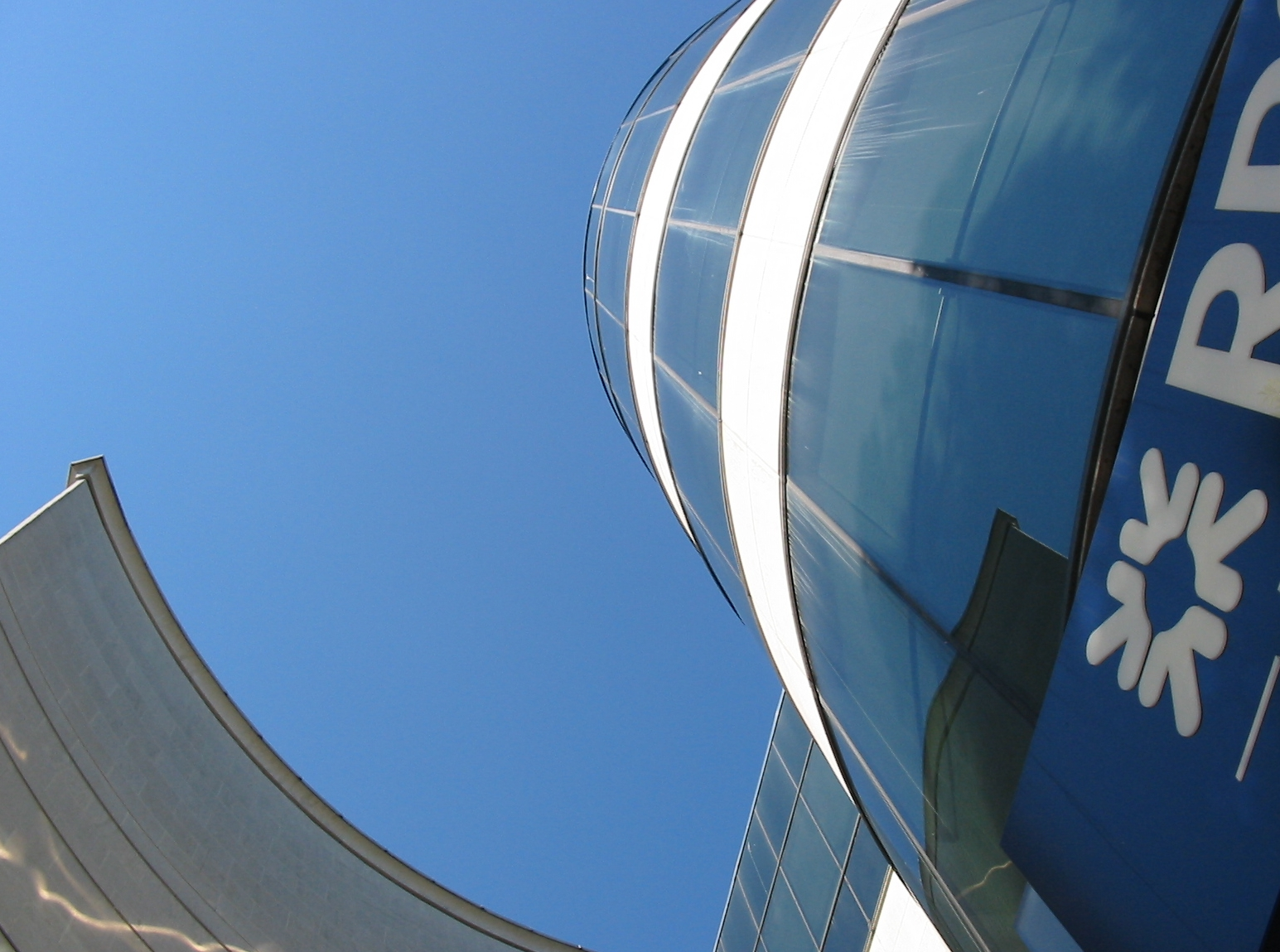
RBS International headquarters in St. Helier, Jersey

=== Royal Bank of Scotland ===
The Royal Bank of Scotland first began offering services to customers in offshore jurisdictions through Williams Deacon Bank, its London and Manchester-based subsidiary, in 1963. RBS International was founded as Williams Deacons Investment and Finance Limited in 1966, becoming Williams & Glyn's Bank Investments (Jersey) Limited in 1970, Williams & Glyn's Bank (Jersey) Limited in 1982 and The Royal Bank of Scotland (Jersey) Limited in 1985, before adopting the present name in 2003. The Royal Bank of Scotland International was first registered as a trading name in 1995 and The Royal Bank of Scotland International (Holdings) Limited was formed in 1996.

The undertaking of The Royal Bank of Scotland (Gibraltar) Limited, which carried on business in Gibraltar under the NatWest and RBS International brands, was transferred to RBS International in 2009.

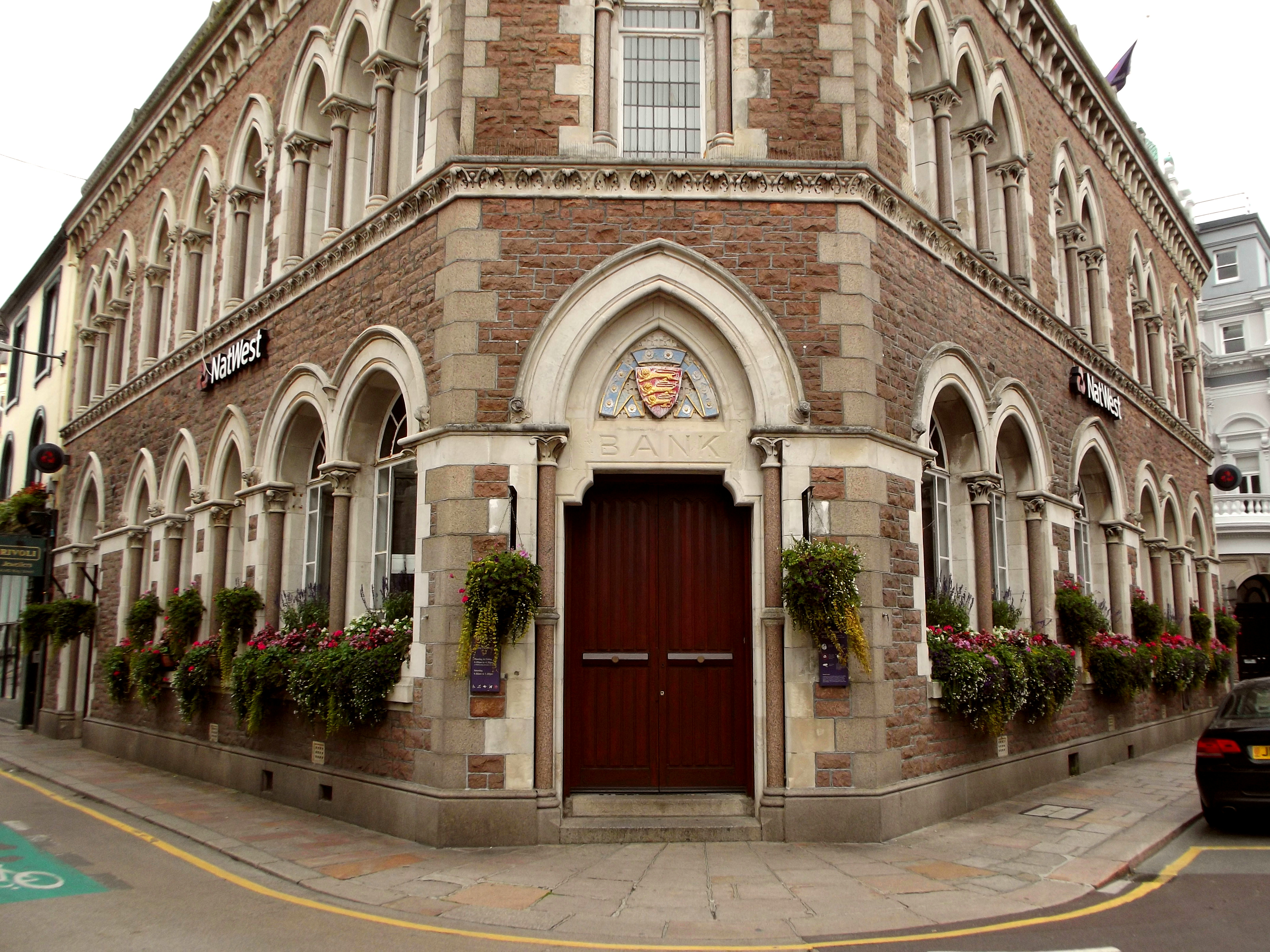
NatWest International branch in St. Helier, Jersey

=== National Westminster Bank ===
NatWest Offshore Limited was an Isle of Man-incorporated bank formed in 1997, with branches in Jersey, Guernsey and Gibraltar. The business was transferred to RBS International through private members' legislation passed in each of the four jurisdictions in 2001, with RBS retaining NatWest as a trading name as well as continuing its existing business.

National Westminster International Holdings BV is the holding company for National Westminster Services (Ireland) Limited (Dublin), RBS Deutschland Holdings GmbH (Frankfurt) and RBS Netherlands Holdings BV (Houten).

=== Isle of Man Bank ===
In 2019, the High Court of Justice of the Isle of Man granted approval for the transfer of the business of Isle of Man Bank Limited (a wholly owned subsidiary of NatWest) to the Isle of Man branch of RBS International, trading as Isle of Man Bank.

=== Coutts Crown Dependencies ===
Following the introduction of ring-fencing regulation in the United Kingdom and after Coutts sold its International business in 2015, Coutts Crown Dependencies became a trading name of RBS International

It has offices in Jersey and the Isle of Mann. It offers a similar product range to that of Coutts in the United Kingdom.

== Operations ==
Headquartered in Jersey, RBS International has a presence in Gibraltar, Guernsey, the Isle of Man, Luxembourg and the United Kingdom. The bank is regulated by the Jersey Financial Services Commission; the Gibraltar branch is regulated and authorised by the Financial Services Commission, Gibraltar to undertake banking and investment business; the Guernsey branch is regulated by the Guernsey Financial Services Commission and licensed under the Banking Supervision (Bailiwick of Guernsey) Law, 1994, as amended, the Insurance Managers and Insurance Intermediaries (Bailiwick of Guernsey) Law, 2002, and the Protection of Investors (Bailiwick of Guernsey) Law, 1987, as amended; and the Isle of Man branch is licensed by the Isle of Man Financial Services Authority in respect of deposit taking, investment business and registered as a general insurance intermediary.

=== Structure ===
Financial services are provided through local and institutional banking customer segments. Local banking provides loan and deposit products and services to personal, private, business and commercial customers. Institutional banking provides services to European fund asset managers, fund administrators and corporate service providers.

In 2022, NatWest Group announced the creation of Commercial and Institutional, which brought together the Commercial, NatWest Markets and RBS International customer businesses as a new operating segment.

=== Services ===
In 2012, it was announced that all personal banking customers would be migrated to the NatWest brand, while business, commercial and corporate banking customers would remain under the RBS International brand. The NatWest trading name was changed to NatWest International in 2017, due to new ring-fencing legislation in the UK.

== See also ==
- NatWest Markets
- Ulster Bank
