= Adam and Company =

Scottish wealth management company

Adam and Company Investment Management Limited
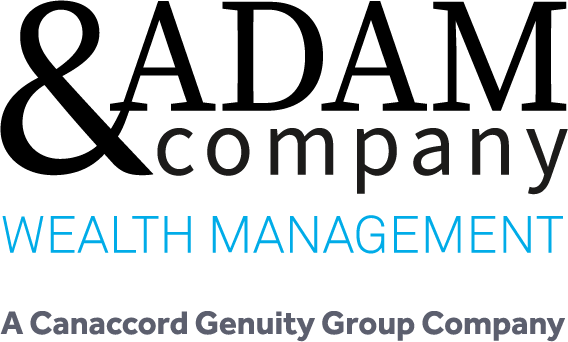
- Trade name: Canaccord Genuity Wealth Management
- Type: Subsidiary
- Industry: Wealth management
- Founded: 1983; 43 years ago
- Headquarters: Edinburgh, Scotland, UK
- Products: Financial services
- Number of employees: <100
- Parent: Canaccord Genuity
- Website: adamandcompany.co.uk

Adam and Company Investment Management Limited is a wealth management company based in Edinburgh, Scotland offering discretionary investment management and wealth planning services to high-net-worth clients in the United Kingdom.

Founded in 1983, it is named after Adam Smith, a leading figure of the Scottish Enlightenment era who revolutionised economic theory in 1776 with the publication of An inquiry into the Nature and Causes of the Wealth of Nations.

In 2021, the business was acquired by Canaccord Genuity Group through its UK wealth management business, Canaccord Genuity Wealth Management.

== History ==
The bank was founded by Sir Iain Noble and another partner in 1983, opening its first branch in Charlotte Square, Edinburgh on 29 May 1984. In 1986, Adam and Company acquired London-based Continental Trust and later established an international arm in Guernsey. Branches in Glasgow, Manchester and Aberdeen were also opened between 1987 and 2005.

=== Royal Bank of Scotland ===
In 1993, following substantial foreign-exchange related losses, Adam and Company was acquired by the Royal Bank of Scotland who provided the capital needed to rebuild the Bank's weakened balance sheet. After the Royal Bank of Scotland acquired NatWest in 2000, restructuring of the group saw Adam and Company placed in the bank's Wealth Management Services division, alongside rival Coutts, the largest private bank in the UK.

In 2002, Adam and Company acquired Stewart Ivory Wealth Management.

In late 2011, the company moved its registered office to a newly refurbished Georgian townhouse at 25 Saint Andrew Square.

During the years until 2012, Adam and Company established itself as a bank for the wealthy. In 2012, Adam and Company became the first UK bank to implement the Avaloq investment and banking platform which paved the way for integration with Coutts and a range of efficiency savings leading to job losses for almost half of the workforce.

The Adam International business in Guernsey closed in 2012 and the Manchester office closed in 2014 after 15 years of operations.

In 2014, as part of a wider and more radical shake-up to the divisional structure of the parent company, Adam and Company, under the leadership of Graham Storrie, was made a subsidiary of Coutts and consolidated into the Commercial and Private Banking division of RBS, under divisional CEO Alison Rose.

In early 2018, the Royal Bank of Scotland Group (now NatWest Group) announced its plans for restructuring to comply with new UK-wide rules on ring-fencing retail banking operations from investment banking operations. As part of this restructuring, all retail banking assets of the Royal Bank of Scotland were transferred to Adam and Company, which was renamed Royal Bank of Scotland. Adam and Company continued as a private banking brand operating on the main PRA licence of RBS, where customers enjoyed privileged services such as relationship management and discounts on standard retail banking products but where FSCS protection for deposits and other regulatory matters were not distinct from those relating to high street banking customers.

In 2022, RBS transferred the banking and lending business to Coutts & Co. using a banking business transfer scheme approved by the Court of Session in Edinburgh under Part VII of the Financial Services and Markets Act 2000.

=== Canaccord Genuity ===
In 2021, the investment management business was acquired by Canaccord Genuity Group through its UK wealth management business, Canaccord Genuity Wealth Management for a cash consideration of £54 million.

== See also ==
- Coutts & Co.
- Child & Co.
- Drummonds Bank
