= NatWest Markets =

Investment banking arm of NatWest Group

NatWest Markets plc
- Formerly: RBSG Public Limited Company (1984–1985); The Royal Bank Of Scotland Public Limited Company (1985–2018)
- Type: Subsidiary
- Industry: Investment Banking
- Founded: 2016 (1992)
- Headquarters: London, England, UK
- Key people: Robert Begbie (chief executive)
- Products: Risk Management; Rates; Financing; Currencies
- Parent: NatWest Group
- Website: ci.natwest.com

NatWest Markets plc is the investment banking arm of NatWest Group based in the United Kingdom.

The company was created from the then RBS Group's corporate and institutional banking division in 2016, as part of a structural reform intended to comply with the requirements of the Financial Services (Banking Reform) Act 2013 and to give the NatWest brand greater prominence. The Act implements the Independent Commission on Banking recommendation that domestic retail banking should be "ring-fenced" from riskier trading activities by 2019. The ring-fenced sub-group, NatWest Holdings, was created at the same time.

To give it legal form, The Royal Bank of Scotland was renamed NatWest Markets in 2018; at the same time Adam and Company (which held a separate PRA banking licence) was renamed The Royal Bank of Scotland, with Adam and Company continuing as an RBS private banking brand until 2022.

== History ==
The NatWest Markets name was previously used from 1992 to 1997, the remnants of which were absorbed into the Royal Bank of Scotland Group on the acquisition of National Westminster Bank in 2000. RBS Group was renamed NatWest Group in 2020.

NatWest Markets' origins lie in County Bank, the merchant banking subsidiary of National Provincial Bank formed in 1965. The original County Bank was established in Manchester in 1862 and, in 1935, merged into District Bank, which was acquired by National Provincial Bank in 1962. The merchant bank acquired various stockbroking and jobbing firms, becoming County NatWest when the banking system was deregulated in 1987; it was later consolidated with corporate banking to form NatWest Markets. NatWest Markets acquired US-based Greenwich Capital in 1996 and became Greenwich NatWest following disposal of large parts of the business.

=== County NatWest ===
The bank's expansion strategy hit trouble with the stock market crash of 1987 and involvement in the financial scandal surrounding the collapse of Blue Arrow. The Department of Trade and Industry report on the affair was critical of the bank's management and resulted in the resignation of several members of the board, including then chairman Lord Boardman.

In the early 1990s, County NatWest merged with NatWest's treasury and foreign exchange divisions to form NatWest Markets. In 1996, NatWest Markets acquired private equity firm Hambro Magan.

=== Greenwich NatWest ===
In 1997, NatWest Markets revealed that a £50m loss had been discovered; this was revised to £90.5m after further investigations. Investor and shareholder confidence was so badly shaken that the Bank of England had to instruct the board of directors to resist calls for the resignation of its most senior executives in an effort to draw a line under the affair.

The bank's internal controls and risk management were severely criticised in 2000 and its aggressive push into investment banking questioned, after a lengthy investigation by the Securities and Futures Authority. The bank's move into complicated derivative products that it did not fully understand seemed to indicate poor management. By the end of the year parts of NatWest Markets had been sold, others becoming Greenwich NatWest in 1998.

== Operations ==
NatWest Markets provides global market access to corporate and institutional customers, offering trading, risk management and financing solutions through its trading and sales operations in London, Singapore and Stamford and sales offices in Dublin, Hong Kong, San Francisco and Tokyo. Its activities are primarily related to the economic environment in the United Kingdom, Europe and the United States, deriving a substantial majority of its income from its operations in the UK.

=== NatWest Markets Securities Inc. ===
Established in 1981, US broker-dealer, Greenwich Capital Markets was acquired by Long-Term Credit Bank of Japan in 1988 and divested to National Westminster Bank in 1996. From 1998 until 2000, when NatWest was taken over by the RBS Group, it was part of Greenwich NatWest under the joint management of co-chief executives Gary Holloway and Konrad "Chip" Kruger.

Greenwich Capital Markets became RBS Securities (trading as RBS) in 2009, prior to which it had used the marketing name RBS Greenwich Capital. It is a direct subsidiary of RBS Holdings USA (until 2009, known as Greenwich Capital Holdings), whose direct parent is Delaware-registered NatWest Group Holdings Corporation, which was formed in 1996 to facilitate the purchase. Based in Stamford, Connecticut, it specialises in fixed income arbitrage and other fixed income strategies. Renamed NatWest Markets Securities Inc. in 2018, it is Financial Industry Regulatory Authority registered and a member of the Securities Investor Protection Corporation.

=== NatWest Markets Securities Japan ===
Registered in Hong Kong and regulated and authorised by the Japanese Financial Services Agency, NatWest Markets Securities Japan Limited operates through its Tokyo branch. Previously a direct subsidiary of RBS, it provides credit trading, bonds, swaps and related financial services. In conjunction with RBS Group's acquisition of parts of ABN AMRO Bank (later RBS N.V.), the two firms' Tokyo branches were consolidated in 2009.

The business was established as County Securities Japan in 1986; it became County NatWest Securities Japan in 1987, NatWest Securities Japan in 1995, Greenwich NatWest Securities Japan in 1998 and RBS Securities Japan in 2001, before adopting the present name in 2018.

=== NatWest Markets N.V. ===
NatWest Markets N.V. traded as The Royal Bank of Scotland N.V. from the 2007 acquisition of ABN AMRO Bank until 2018. The business has been repurposed to provide continuity of service to EU customers following the UK's withdrawal from the European Union, commonly known as Brexit.

NatWest Markets Asia Securities (Singapore) Pte. Ltd. was founded by ABN AMRO in 1987 and operated as The Royal Bank of Scotland Asia Securities (Singapore) from 2009 until 2018. NatWest Markets N.V. is registered in Amsterdam and regulated and authorised by De Nederlandsche Bank.

=== NatWest Markets Services India ===
NatWest Markets Services India Pvt. Ltd. is registered as a service company with offices in Gurugram, Chennai, Delhi, Bengaluru and Mumbai.

== Strategic shift ==
In 2020, NatWest Group announced that NatWest Markets would be refocused to support a more integrated corporate and institutional customer offering. This would mean a period of significant transformation for the business, which would have a leaner operating model and would focus capital towards supporting the Group’s customers’ needs and increasing its focus on digital solutions. Alongside this, it was announced that it would be reducing its risk-weighted assets, managing down and optimising inefficient capital and activities.

In 2022, NatWest Group announced the creation of Commercial and Institutional, which brought together the Commercial, NatWest Markets and RBS International customer businesses as a new operating segment.

== See also ==
- NatWest Three
- RBS International
