= Ulster Bank =

British commercial bank

National Westminster Bank Plc trading as Ulster Bank
- Trade name: Ulster Bank
- Type: Private
- Industry: Financial services
- Founded: 22 February 1836; 190 years ago Belfast, Ireland, United Kingdom, as the Ulster Banking Company
- Headquarters: Belfast, Northern Ireland
- Key people: Jane Howard
- Products: Various banking products
- Number of employees: 3,250 (2013)
- Parent: NatWest Holdings
- Website: www.ulsterbank.co.uk

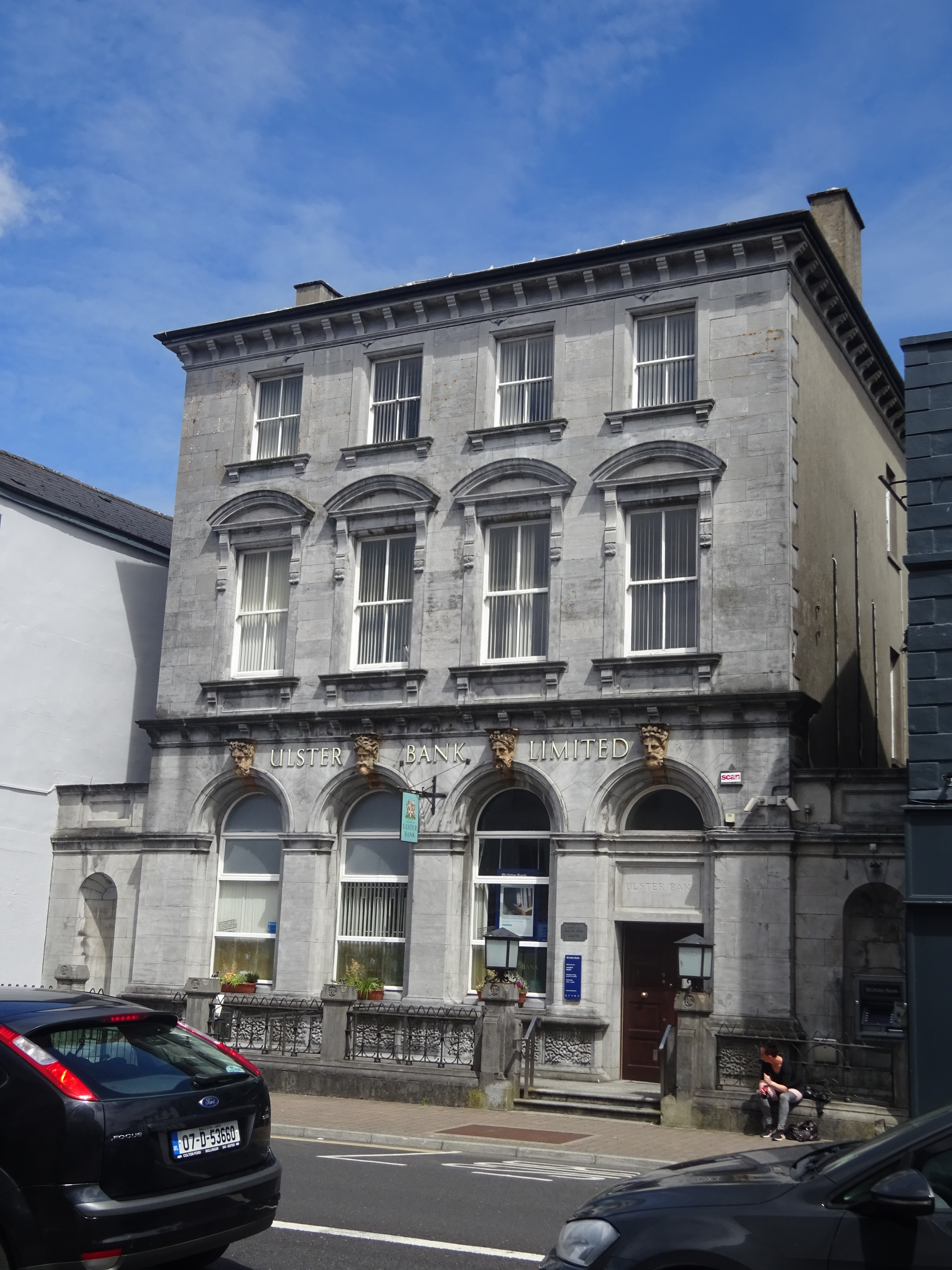
Ulster Bank, Longford

Ulster Bank is one of the traditional Big Four Irish clearing banks. The Ulster Bank Group was subdivided into two separate legal entities: National Westminster Bank Plc, trading as Ulster Bank (registered in England and Wales and operating in Northern Ireland) (Note: registered as Ulster Bank Ltd, a Northern Ireland company until May 2021); and, until April 2023, Ulster Bank Ireland DAC (registered in the Republic of Ireland). Prior to the closure of Ulster Bank in the Republic of Ireland in April 2023, the headquarters of Ulster Bank in the Republic of Ireland were located on George's Quay, Dublin, whilst the headquarters of Ulster Bank Northern Ireland are in Donegall Square East, Belfast, and it maintains a large sector of the financial services in both the UK and the Republic of Ireland.

Established in 1836, Ulster Bank was acquired by the London County and Westminster Bank in 1917. As a wholly owned subsidiary of National Westminster Bank (NatWest), it became part of the Royal Bank of Scotland Group in 2000. RBS Group was renamed NatWest Group in 2020. However, the Ulster Bank brand is used on the island of Ireland. The bank has 25 branches (formerly 90) in Northern Ireland, and previously 146 branches in the Republic of Ireland with over 1,200 non-charging ATMs. It has over 3,000 employees and over 1.9 million clients.

On 19 February 2021, NatWest Group announced a phased withdrawal of all banking activity and associated services within the Republic of Ireland. On 3 May 2021, the business of Ulster Bank Limited in Northern Ireland was transferred to the parent National Westminster Bank as part of a court-approved Banking Business Transfer Scheme. Ulster Bank ceased its operations in the Republic of Ireland on 21 April 2023. From 2014 to 2023, it had been designated as a Significant Institution under European Banking Supervision and thus directly supervised by the European Central Bank.

== History ==
=== 19th century ===
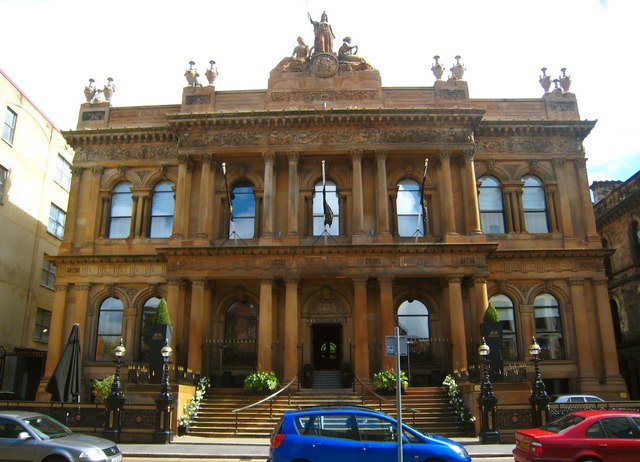
Former Ulster Bank headquarters on Waring Street in Belfast, today the Merchant Hotel (2010)

Ulster Bank was founded as The Ulster Banking Company in Belfast, Ulster, in 1836, by a breakaway faction of shareholders in the newly formed National Bank of Ireland, which had been founded in 1835, who objected to the latter bank's plan to invest profits from the bank in London rather than in Belfast. The founding directors of the bank were John Heron, Robert Grimshaw, John Currell, who was a linen bleacher from Ballymena, and James Steen, a Belfast pork curer.

Ulster Bank opened for business on 1 July 1836 on Waring Street, Belfast. It issued its own banknotes from the outset. Within a year, it opened branches at Antrim, Armagh, Ballymoney, Comber, Downpatrick, Enniskillen, Lurgan, Portadown and Tandragee. In the following two decades, it opened eleven more branches throughout the nine counties of Ulster.

In 1860, Ulster Bank opened a new head office on Waring Street, Belfast, together with branches in Sligo and in Ardee, Co. Louth. In 1862, it opened an office at College Green, Dublin. Over the following twelve years, it opened another 24 branches. It established a limited liability company in 1883, named Ulster Bank Ltd. It opened further branches in Dublin, on Baggot Street and Camden Street, and moved to a new premises on College Green in 1891.

=== 20th century ===
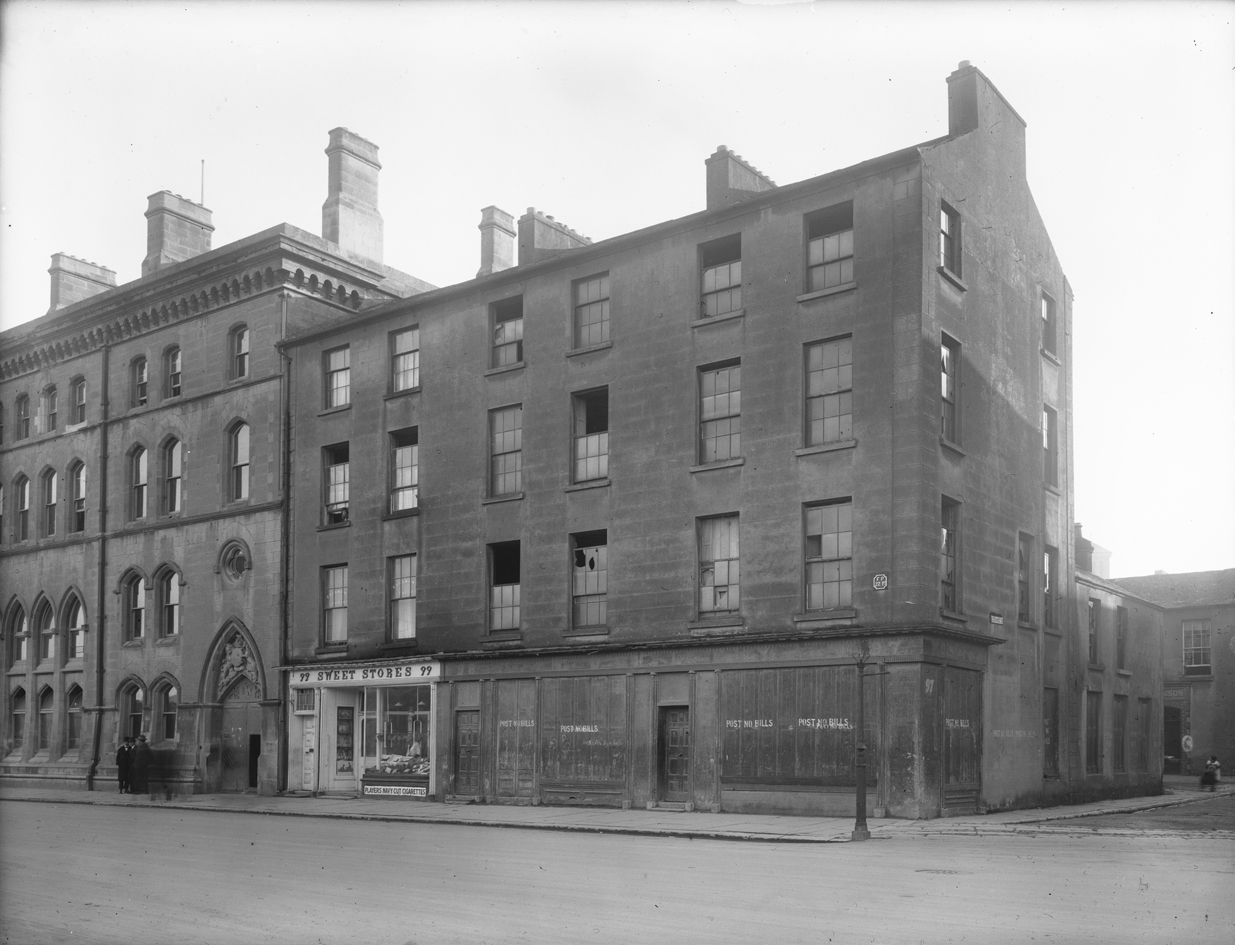
Ulster Bank, The Quays, Waterford (1928)

In the early 1900s, Ulster Bank opened branches in Wexford, Dún Laoghaire, Cork, Waterford and Limerick. It was acquired by the London County and Westminster Bank in 1917, but retained its separate identity.

In the 1960s, Ulster Bank opened branches in the suburbs of Belfast and Dublin, together with branches in airports. It introduced ATMs.

On 16 May 1968, Ulster Bank announced that the administration of its lending activities in the Republic of Ireland would be moved from Belfast to Dublin. In 1968, Ulster Bank's parent bank (by then named Westminster Bank) amalgamated with National Provincial Bank to form National Westminster Bank.

In the 1970s, Ulster Bank introduced mobile banks in some rural areas. It moved to a new head office on Donegall Place, Belfast. In 1975, Ulster Bank acquired the Irish interests of Lombard Bank and North Central Finance. It adopted the slogan "the friendly bank".

In 1980, Ulster Bank introduced the "Henri Hippo" money box and savings plan for schoolchildren. In 1989, it launched the Ulster Bank Visa card.

During the 1990s, Ulster Bank installed ATMs at non-branch locations and had the largest network of ATMs in Ireland by 1995. It introduced the Switch debit card and continued to expand its branch network throughout the 1990s. In 1997, it opened its new head offices at George's Quay, Dublin.

=== 21st century ===
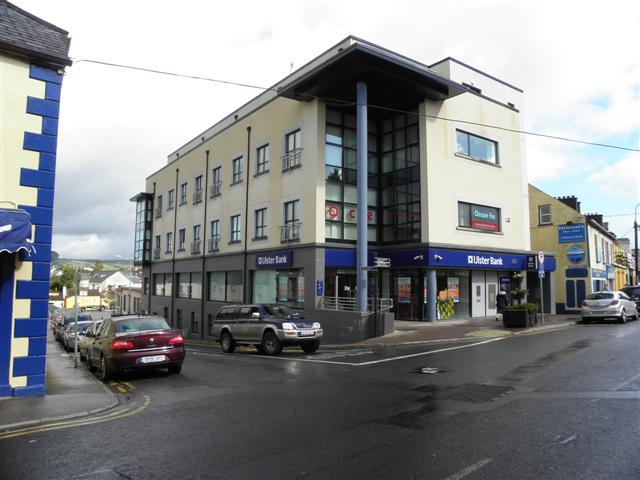
Ulster Bank, Donegal town

In 2000, Ulster Bank opened a new office at Donegall Square East, Belfast. Its parent, National Westminster Bank, was acquired by the Royal Bank of Scotland Group in 2000. In 2001, Ulster Bank's banking business in the Republic of Ireland was transferred to Ulster Bank Ireland Ltd in accordance with Irish law.

In 2002, three Ulster Bank employees were arrested on charges of theft and money laundering. The three were responsible for the destruction of old banknotes at the bank's former Waring Street cash centre. Between November 2001 and February 2002, they were accused of stealing approximately UK£900,000 of used banknotes designated for disposal. The money was then placed in various bank and building society accounts. On 23 January 2004, the men were jailed for two and a half years for the theft of £770,000. Lord Chief Justice Sir Brian Kerr criticised the bank's security measures during the trial.

In 2003, Ulster Bank Group purchased First Active, Ireland's oldest building society, for €887 million, with First Active retaining its separate identity. In 2005, Ulster Bank's logo was changed to the "daisy wheel" of Royal Bank of Scotland. In 2009, the First Active branch network and business of several hundred thousand savers and borrowers was merged with Ulster Bank, and the brand name was retired in 2010.

In 2011, Ulster Bank brought the struggling County Down development The Outlet, Ulster Bank later sold the shopping outlet to Lotus Property in 2016.

In June 2012, a computer system failure prevented customers from accessing accounts. Initial estimates that the problem would be sorted out within a week were wildly optimistic, with thousands of customers still unable to access their accounts into late July 2012, with ongoing issues still not resolved by mid-August 2012. This RBS / NatWest / Ulster Bank issue has proved to be one of the largest IT failures the world has ever known. Ulster Bank (the smallest part of the RBS group) was to initially set aside £28 million for compensation to customers.

In 2015, the Central Bank of Ireland opened an investigation into the lenders which sold tracker mortgages, finding Ulster Bank, KBC Bank Ireland, Permanent TSB, Bank of Ireland and AIB had denied their customers the correct rates. It transpired that in the Republic of Ireland from 2008, Ulster Bank Ireland DAC had encouraged customers on tracker mortgages to switch to the more-profitable fixed rate mortgages as interest rates on tracker mortgages, which is set to the European Central Bank borrowing rate plus 1%, reduced significantly due to the 2008 financial crisis. As part of this, mortgage customers were not told about the risks of moving to a fixed rate, and were instead encouraged with the offer of constant mortgage repayments and interest. Other customers were offered a temporary switch to a fixed rate mortgage, with the promise of being moved back to a tracker rate after a time period, which did not occur until customers complained as per a company policy introduced in 2011. The Central Bank of Ireland ultimately fined Ulster Bank Ireland DAC €37.774 million on 25 March 2021, after discovering 5,940 customers had been directly affected by the scandal, along with 49 separate regulatory breaches.

In September 2020, The Irish Times reported that NatWest was considering closing all Ulster Bank operations in the Republic of Ireland, a process that would take around six years. The bank would continue to operate in Northern Ireland. It had previously been reported in March 2014 that the then RBS Group was considering merging the bank in the Republic of Ireland with some of its rivals in order to reduce its holding, with RBS Group's annual results for 2013 having revealed that Ulster Bank had operating losses of £1.5 billion and accounted for a fifth of the parent group's total bad debt charges, although in October 2014, RBS had confirmed it would retain Ulster Bank following improved market conditions in Ireland. However, Ulster Bank's operations in Ireland had been formally split into two separate entities in Northern Ireland and the Republic of Ireland in 2015.

In February 2021, following an extensive review, NatWest Group confirmed plans to withdraw Ulster Bank from the Republic of Ireland, with a "phased withdrawal" over the "coming years".

In May 2022, Ulster Bank announced it would close nine branches across Northern Ireland in the following three months.

Ulster Bank began freezing certain current and deposit accounts in the Republic of Ireland on 11 November 2022, which were to be closed 30 days later, as part of its staggered process of eventually closing all such accounts. Twenty-five of their branches closed on 6 and 13 January 2023 and were taken over by Permanent TSB. The remaining 63 branches closed on 21 April 2023.

On 21 November 2023, Ulster Bank announced it would close a further 10 branches in Northern Ireland in 2024, thereby reducing its total number of branches to 25.

On 27 June 2025, Ulster Bank handed their banking licence in the Republic of Ireland back to the Central Bank of Ireland.

== Services ==
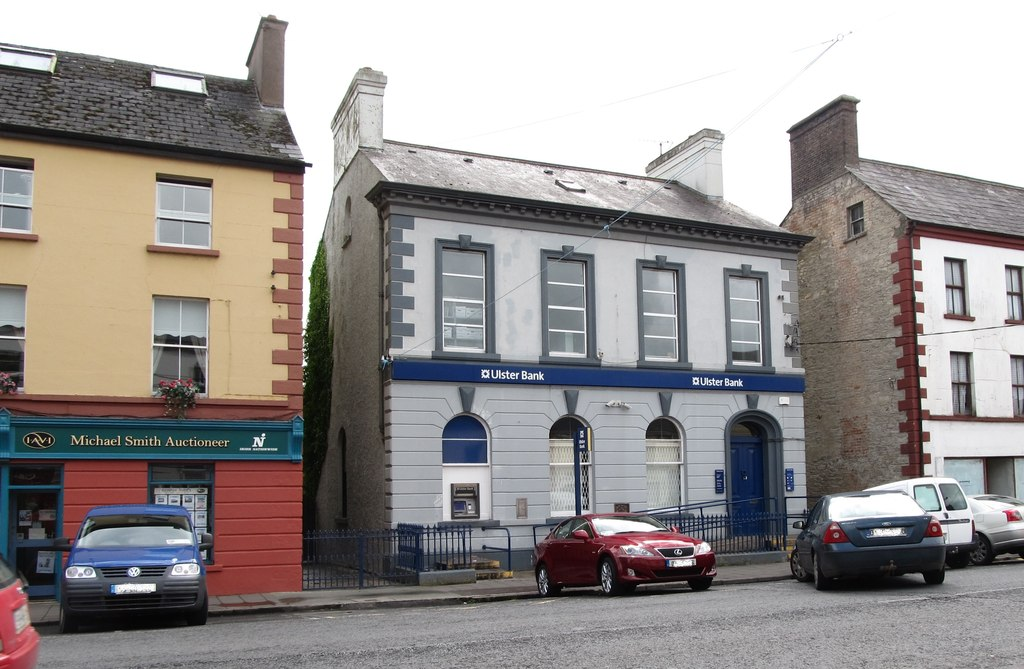
Ulster Bank, Cootehill

Ulster Bank provide a full range of banking and insurance services to personal, business and commercial customers.

In Northern Ireland, as a trading name of National Westminster Bank, the bank is authorised by the Prudential Regulation Authority and regulated by both the Financial Conduct Authority and the Prudential Regulation Authority. National Westminster Bank is a member of the Financial Services Compensation Scheme and UK Finance. In the Republic of Ireland, the bank is regulated by the Central Bank of Ireland.

The bank provides a Debit Mastercard to customers with their current accounts, in addition to other financial services. It launched 15 new commitments to its retail customers in September 2010.

== Corporate identity ==
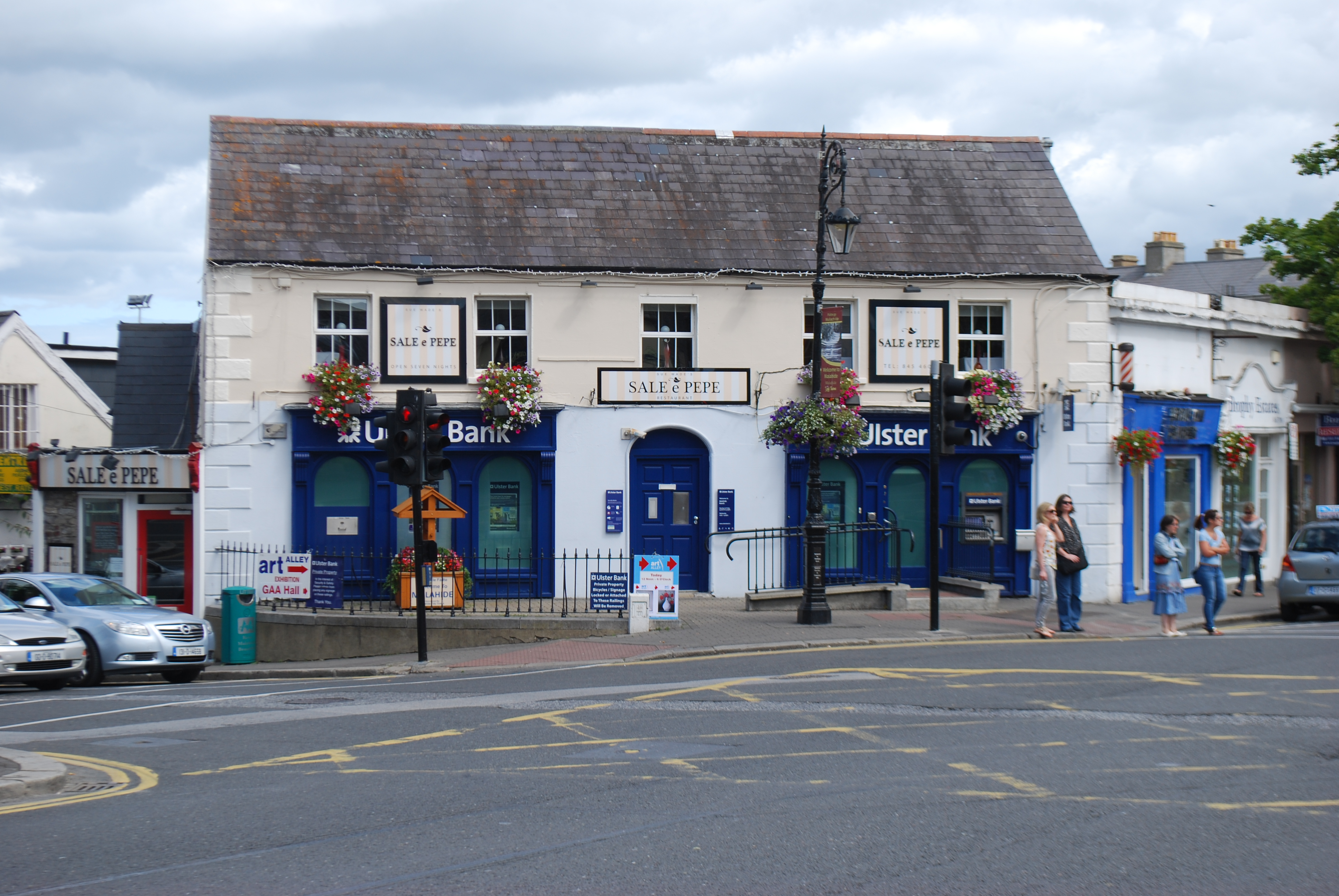
Ulster Bank, Malahide

Until 1963/1964, Ulster Bank did not use a logo in the modern sense, and for branding purposes, it used either its name alone or its name together with its coat of arms. From 1964–1965, it began to develop a logo for branding purposes, beginning with a large, bold "UB" featuring its coat of arms, followed by a large "UB" in outline, and finally an entwined U and B.

During 1969–1970, Ulster Bank gradually transitioned to the logo of the newly formed National Westminster Bank, featuring three arrowheads.

In 2005, Ulster Bank's logo was changed to the "daisy wheel" of the Royal Bank of Scotland, together with its typeface design.

Ulster Bank is one of the three banks that issue pound sterling banknotes in Northern Ireland.

== Banknotes ==
The commemorative George Best five-pound sterling note issued by Ulster Bank in Northern Ireland

In common with two other banks of Northern Ireland, Ulster Bank retains the right to issue its own banknotes. These are pound sterling notes and equal in value to Bank of England notes, and should not be confused with banknotes of the former Irish pound, which was the official currency of the Republic of Ireland until it was replaced by the euro in 2002.

Ulster Bank's current notes all share the same design of a view of Belfast Harbour flanked by landscape views; the design of the reverse is dominated by the bank's coat of arms. The principal difference between the denominations is their colour and size. Notes incorporate a foil patch security feature depicting the bank's logo.

- 5-pound note, grey
- 10-pound note, blue-green
- 20-pound note, purple
- 50-pound note, blue

In November 2006, Ulster Bank issued its first commemorative banknote – an issue of one million £5 notes commemorating the first anniversary of the death of former Northern Irish and Manchester United footballer, George Best. This was the first Ulster Bank banknote to incorporate the RBS "daisy wheel", and the entire issue was taken by collectors within hours of becoming available in bank branches.

In 2019, Ulster Bank issued a new series of banknotes printed in polymer, which replaced its paper equivalents that were previously in circulation.

== Sponsorship ==
On 8 February 2008, Ulster Bank Group Chief Executive, Cormac McCarthy, announced a three-year sponsorship deal worth over £1 million for the Belfast Festival at Queen's. It was hailed as a "new dawn" for the festival which had been suffering underfunding.

Ulster Bank was the first overall sponsor of The Balmoral Show in 2009, Northern Ireland's largest agricultural show.

Ulster Bank announced official sponsorship of the GAA All-Ireland Senior Football Championship in April 2008.

== See also ==
- NatWest Holdings
- NatWest Markets
- List of banks in the Republic of Ireland
