= Gill Whitehead =

British executive

Gill Whitehead OBE
- Education: University of Oxford (MSc, 2021)
- Occupations: Executive in technology, media and sports governance.

Gillian Rosemary Whitehead OBE is a British executive, with experience in digital safety and corporate governance. She is a non-executive director at the British Olympic Association and NatWest Group and chair of the board for the 2025 Women's Rugby World Cup.

== Career ==
Whitehead was a student at King Henry VIII School, Coventry. She trained as an economist, and worked for the BBC, Channel 4 and Google. She has a master's degree in the social sciences of the internet from Oxford University, and is a fellow of the Institute of Chartered Accountants.

In November 2021, Whitehead was appointed by Ofcom to be the chief executive officer of the new digital regulators forum, established in response to the proposed Online Safety Act. Whitehead was one of several women hired from senior positions in major technology companies to take on this new regulatory role. In late 2022, Whitehead was appointed as Ofcom's Group Director for Online Safety. Whitehead was appointed a non-executive director of the NatWest Group in January 2025.

== Sports governance ==
Whitehead played rugby league for England students, and is a qualified RFU coach. In May 2021, she was appointed as an independent non-executive director of the British Olympic Association. In January 2023, Whitehead was announced as the independent chair of the board for the Rugby World Cup, which was held in England in August and September 2025.

Whitehead was a guest on Cerys Matthews' show on BBC 6 Music on 22 June 2025, as a part of programme celebrating the women's summer of sport.

In December 2025, Whitehead was appointed OBE in the King's New Years Honours list for services to Women's Rugby.
