= NatWest =

British retail and commercial bank

National Westminster Bank Plc

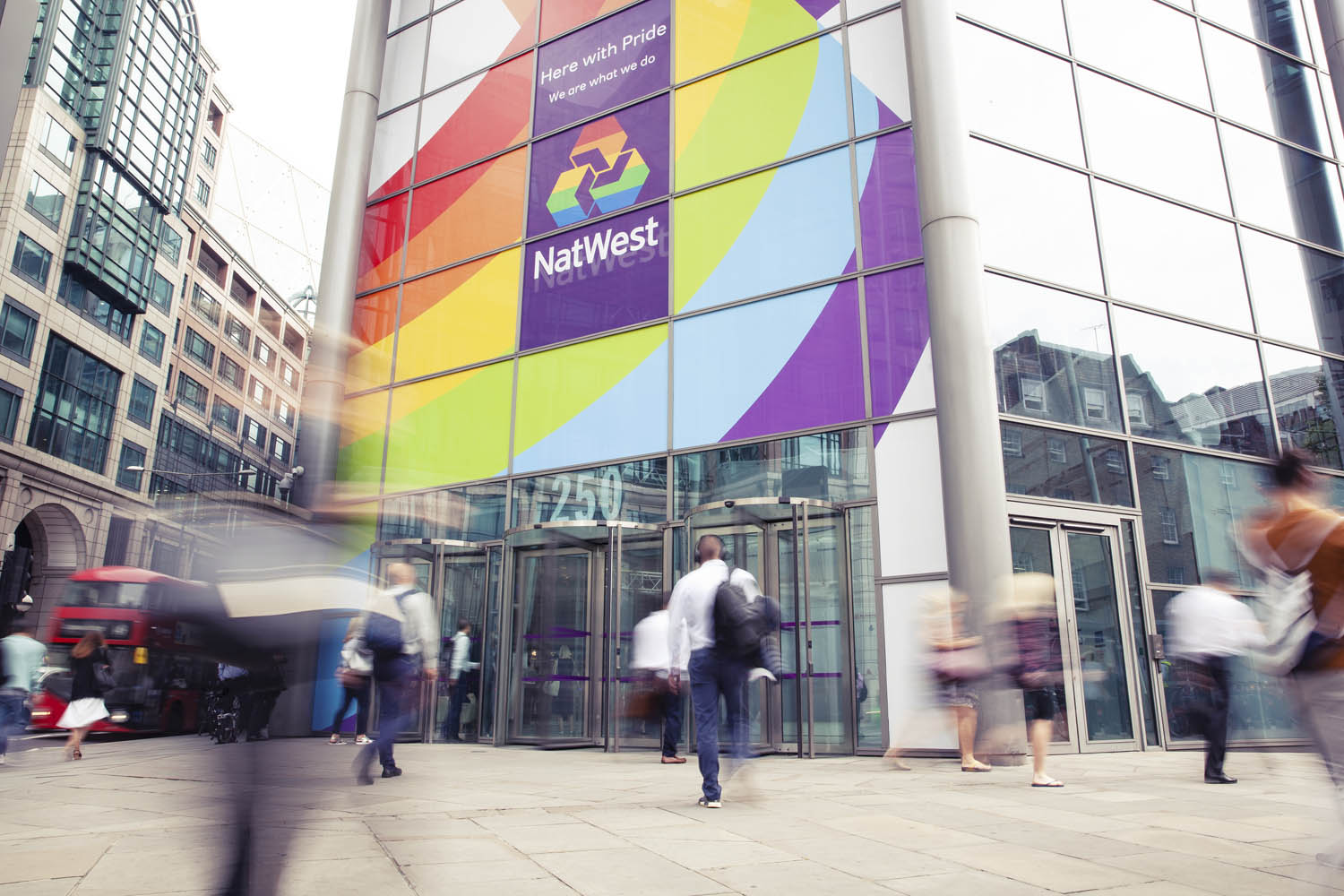
- NatWest's headquarters at 250 Bishopsgate in the City of London
- Trade name: NatWest
- Formerly: National Westminster Bank Limited (1968–1981)
- Type: Private
- Industry: Financial services
- Predecessor: National Provincial Bank; Westminster Bank; District Bank
- Founded: 1658; 368 years ago (Samuel Smith & Co)
- Headquarters: London, England, UK
- Key people: Richard Haythornthwaite (chairman); Paul Thwaite (chief executive)
- Products: Banking; Investments; Lending; Insurance
- Owner: NatWest Holdings
- Parent: NatWest Group
- Subsidiaries: Coutts
- Website: www.natwest.com

National Westminster Bank Plc, commonly known as NatWest, is a major retail and commercial bank in the United Kingdom based in London, England. It was established in 1968 by the merger of National Provincial Bank and Westminster Bank. In 2000, it became part of The Royal Bank of Scotland Group, which was re-named NatWest Group in 2020. Following ringfencing of the group's core domestic business, the bank became a direct subsidiary of NatWest Holdings; NatWest Markets comprises the non-ringfenced investment banking arm. NatWest International is a trading name of RBS International, which also sits outside the ringfence.

Between 2008 and 2025, the UK government held a stake in NatWest Group following its £45 billion ($61.87 billion) bailout of the lender which led to it owning 84% at one point. The bank returned to full private ownership on 30 May 2025 after 17 years.

NatWest is considered one of the Big Four clearing banks in the UK, and it has a large network of over 526 branches and 5,500 cash machines across Great Britain and Ireland and offers 24-hour Actionline telephone and online banking services. As of 2025, according to the company's own statements, it serves around 19 million customers, including 2.4 million youth customers. In Northern Ireland, it owns and operates the Ulster Bank brand.

== History ==
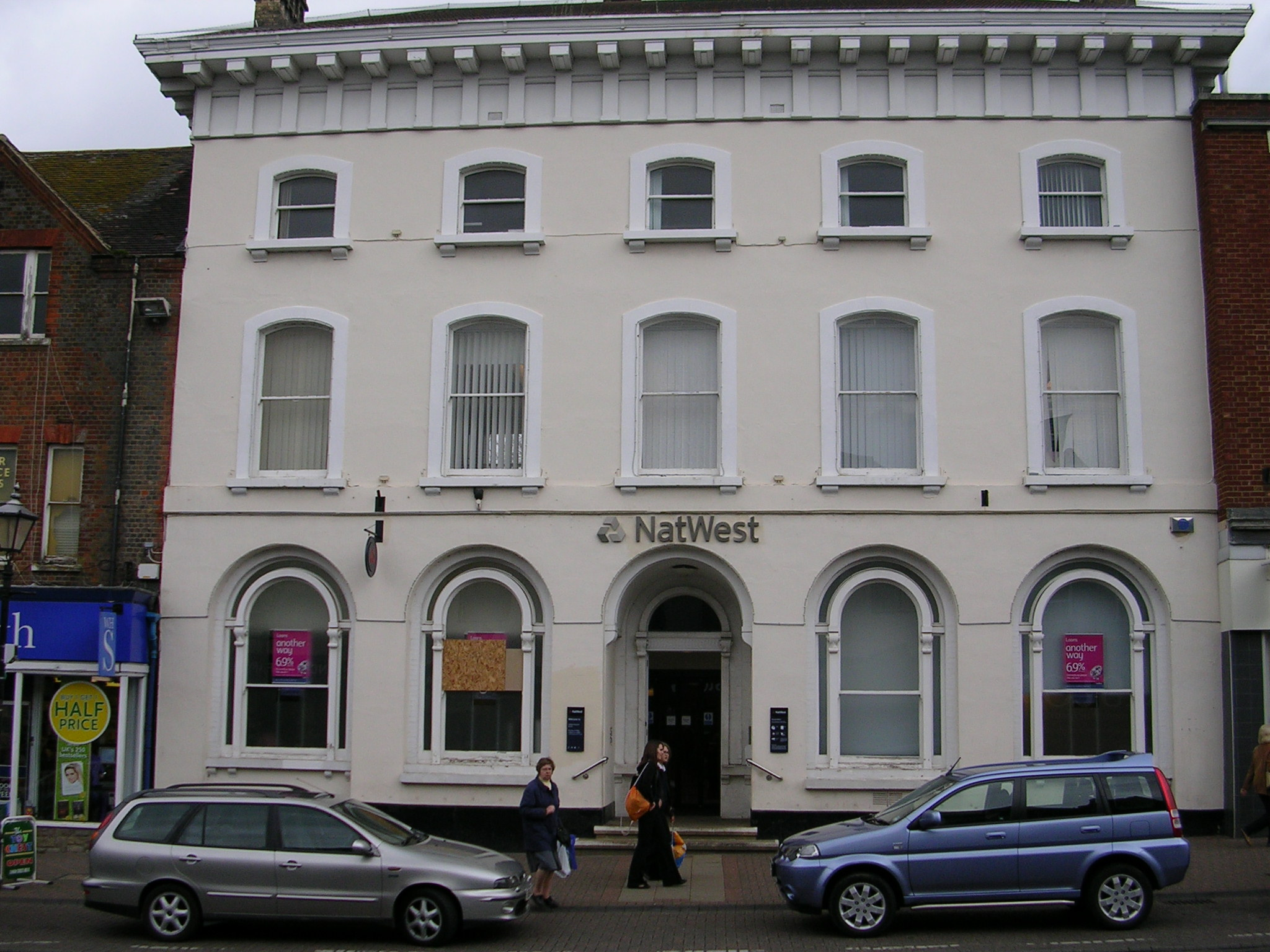
The NatWest branch at Leighton Buzzard, Bedfordshire, an example of Neo-Renaissance architecture

=== Early history (1658–1970s) ===
The bank's origins date back to 1658 with the foundation of Smith's Bank of Nottingham. Its oldest direct corporate ancestor, National Provincial Bank, was formed in 1833 as the National Provincial Bank of England. It merged with Union of London and Smith's Bank in 1918 to become National Provincial and Union Bank, shortening its name in 1924. District Bank (formed in 1829 as the Manchester and Liverpool District Banking Company) was acquired by National Provincial in 1962 and allowed to operate under its own name. Westminster Bank was formed in 1834 as London and Westminster Bank. It merged with London and County Bank in 1909 to become London County and Westminster Bank and with Parr's Bank in 1918 to become London County Westminster and Parrs Bank, shortening its name in 1923.

National Westminster Bank Act 1969
- Act of Parliament
- Parliament of the United Kingdom
- Long title: An Act to provide for the transfer to National Westminster Bank Limited of the undertakings of District Bank Limited, National Provincial Bank Limited and Westminster Bank Limited; and for other purposes incidental thereto and consequential thereon.
- Citation: 1969 c. xxii

Dates
- Royal assent: 25 June 1969

Text of statute as originally enacted

The creation of the modern National Westminister Bank was announced in 1968 and commenced trading on 1 January 1970 after the statutory process of integration had been completed by the National Westminster Bank Act 1969 (c. xxii). The three arrowheads device was adopted as the new bank's logo; according to the design firm, the logo represents the bank's three integrated constituents. The District, National Provincial and Westminster banks were fully integrated in the new firm's structure, but private bankers Coutts & Co (a 1920 National Provincial acquisition, established 1692), Ulster Bank in Northern Ireland (a 1917 Westminster acquisition, established 1836) and the Isle of Man Bank (a 1961 National Provincial acquisition, established 1865) continued as separate operations. Westminster Foreign Bank (established 1913) was restyled International Westminster Bank in 1973. Duncan Stirling, outgoing chairman of Westminster Bank, became first chairman of the fifth-largest bank in the world. In 1969 David Robarts, former chairman of National Provincial, assumed Stirling's position. In 1975, it was one of the first London banks to open a representative office in Scotland. It was a founder member of the Joint Credit Card Company (with Lloyds Bank, Midland Bank and Williams & Glyn's Bank) which launched the Access credit card (now part of Mastercard) in 1972 and in 1976 it introduced the Servicetill cash machine. The same banks, excluding Lloyds, were later responsible for the introduction of the Switch debit card (later branded Maestro) in 1988.

=== Expansion (1980s) ===
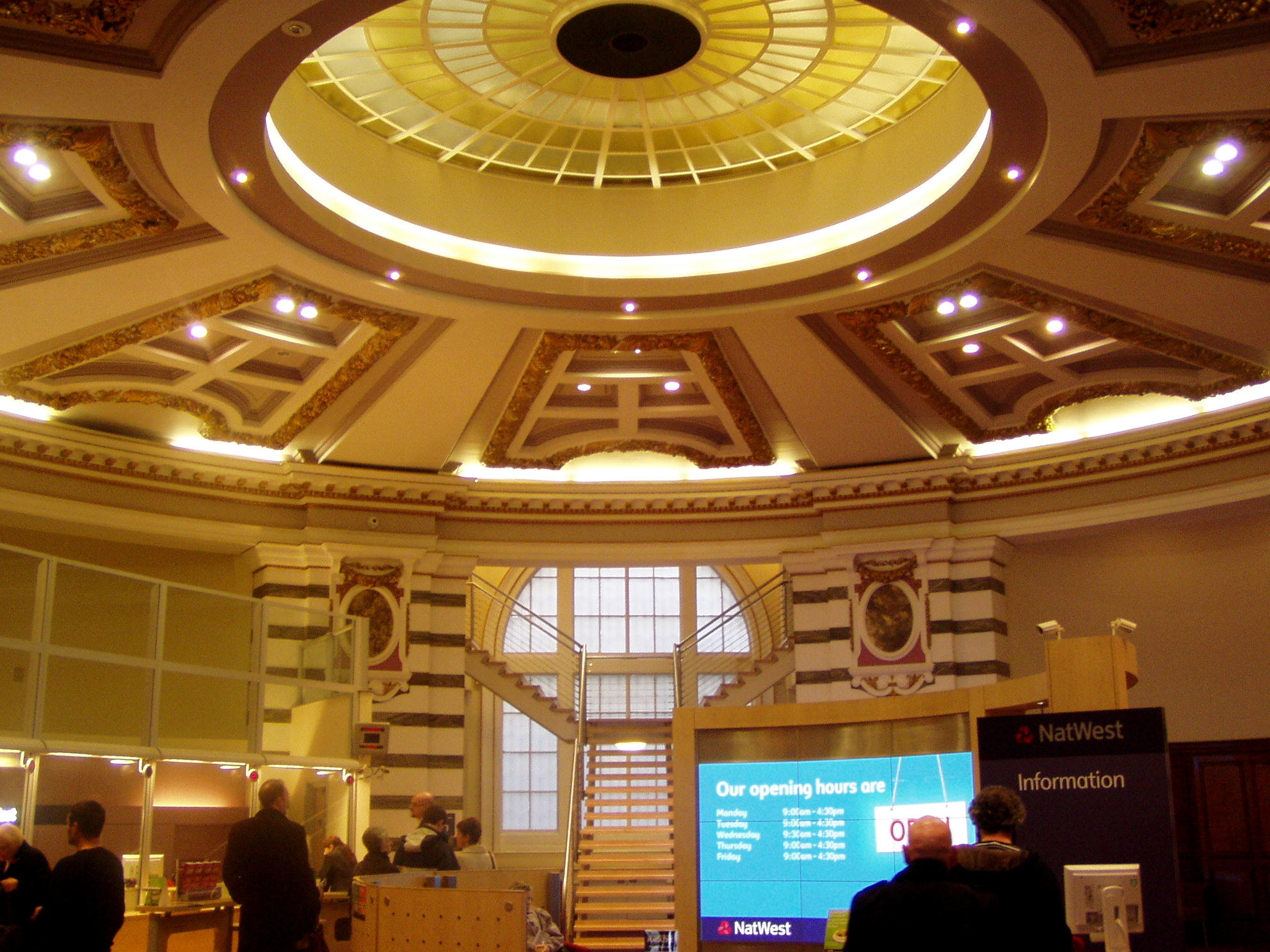
The circular banking hall at Castle Street, Liverpool, a Grade II* listed building

Deregulation in the 1980s, culminating in the Big Bang in 1986, also encouraged the bank to enter the securities business. County Bank, its merchant banking subsidiary formed in 1965, acquired various stockbroking and jobbing firms to create the investment banking arm County NatWest. National Westminster Home Loans was established in 1980 and other initiatives included the launch of the Piggy Account for children in 1983, the Credit Zone, a flexible overdraft facility on which customers only pay interest (now commonplace, this so-called pink debt was innovative when launched) and the development of the Mondex electronic purse (later sold to MasterCard Worldwide) in 1990. The Action Bank advertising campaign spearheaded a new marketing-led approach to business development. Under the direction of Robin Leigh-Pemberton, who became chairman in 1977, the bank also expanded internationally, forming National Westminster Bancorp in the United States of America with a network of 340 branches across two states, National Westminster Bank of Canada and NatWest Australia Bank; and opening branches on the European continent and in the Far East. In 1982, the Frankfurt office of International Westminster Bank merged with Global Bank AG to form Deutsche Westminster Bank. In 1985, Banco NatWest España was formed and National Westminster Bank SA was incorporated in 1988, taking over the bank's six branches in France and Monaco. In 1989, International Westminster Bank was merged into National Westminster Bank by Act of Parliament.

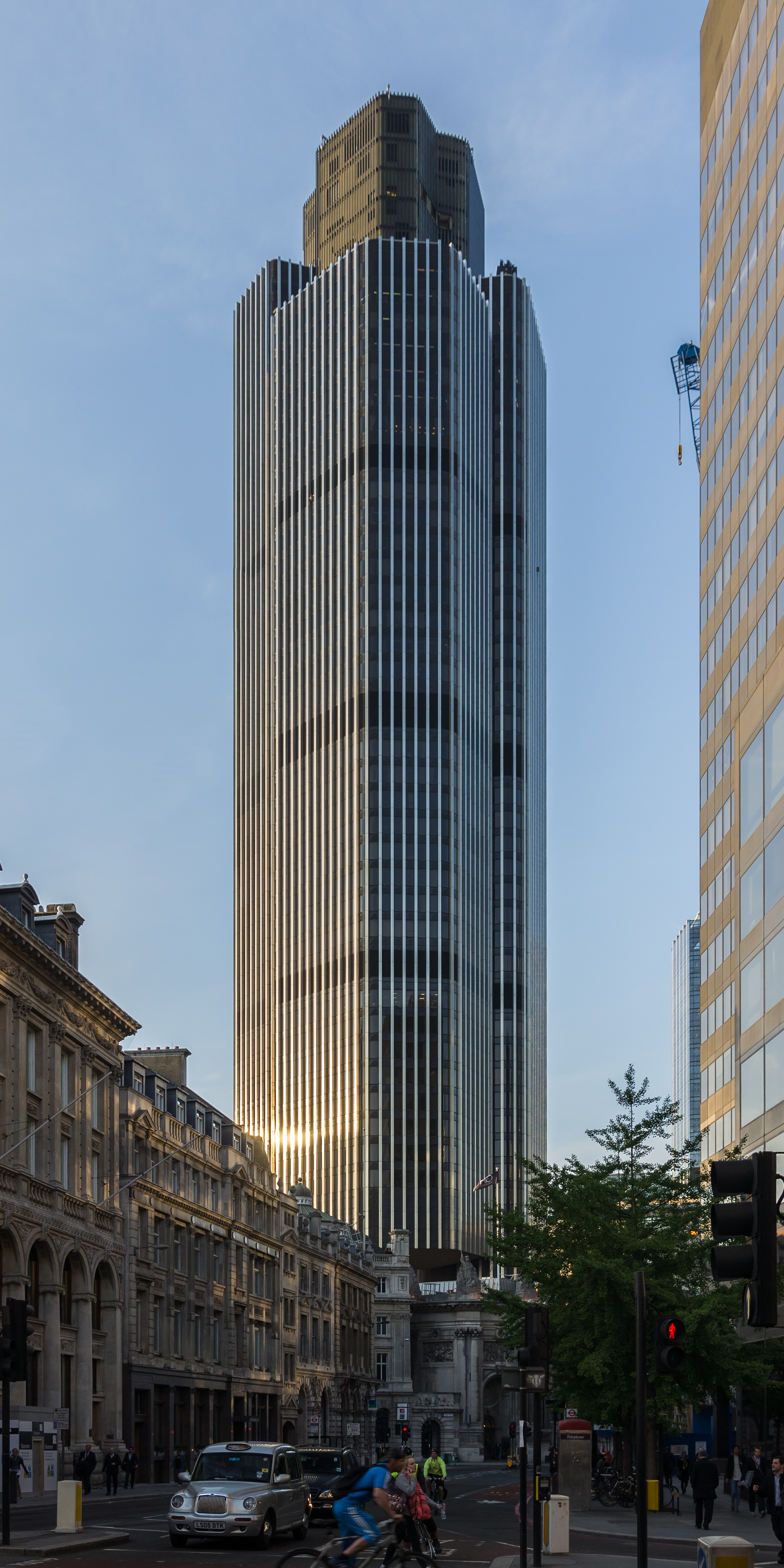
The former NatWest Tower (now known as Tower 42), seen from the junction of Bishopsgate with Leadenhall Street in the City of London

Completed in 1980, the bank built the National Westminster Tower (now known as Tower 42) in London to serve as its international headquarters. At a height of 600 feet (183 m) it was the tallest building in the UK until the topping-out of Canary Wharf Tower 10 years later; its footprint loosely approximating the bank's logo when viewed from the air, although the architect claimed the similarity was coincidence. Also worthy of note is National Westminster House (since renamed as 103 Colmore Row) in Birmingham: the building was sold to British Land in 2007 and demolished in 2015.

=== Controversy (1980s–1990s) ===
The bank was hit by the stock market crash of 1987 and involvement in the collapse of Blue Arrow. The Department of Trade and Industry report on the affair was critical of the bank's management and resulted in the resignation of several members of the board, including then-chairman Lord Boardman. Later, the bank would divest its overseas subsidiaries. The North American operations were sold to Fleet Bank and Hong Kong Bank of Canada, and the Australian and New Zealand branches were sold to Salomon Smith Barney and the National Australia Bank. Thereafter the bank concentrated on its core domestic business as the restyled NatWest Group, reflecting its modern positioning as a portfolio of businesses. In the 1993 Bishopsgate bombing, the NatWest Tower was devastated by a Provisional IRA bomb and the bank vacated the building and later sold it. Then, in 1997, NatWest Markets, the corporate and investment banking arm formed in 1992, revealed that a £50 million ($67.75 million) loss had been discovered, revised to £90.5 million ($122.62 million) after further investigations. Investor and shareholder confidence was so badly shaken that the Bank of England had to instruct the board of directors to resist calls for the resignation of its most senior executives in an effort to draw a line under the affair. The bank's internal controls and risk management were severely criticised in 2000 and its aggressive push into investment banking questioned, after a lengthy investigation by the Securities and Futures Authority. The bank's move into complicated derivative products that it did not fully understand seemed to indicate poor management. By the end of 1997 parts of NatWest Markets had been sold, others becoming Greenwich NatWest in 1998. It had purchased Gleacher Partners in 1996 for $135 million only to resell it back to GP's founder for just $4 million 3 years later in 1999.

=== Takeover (1990s–2000s) ===
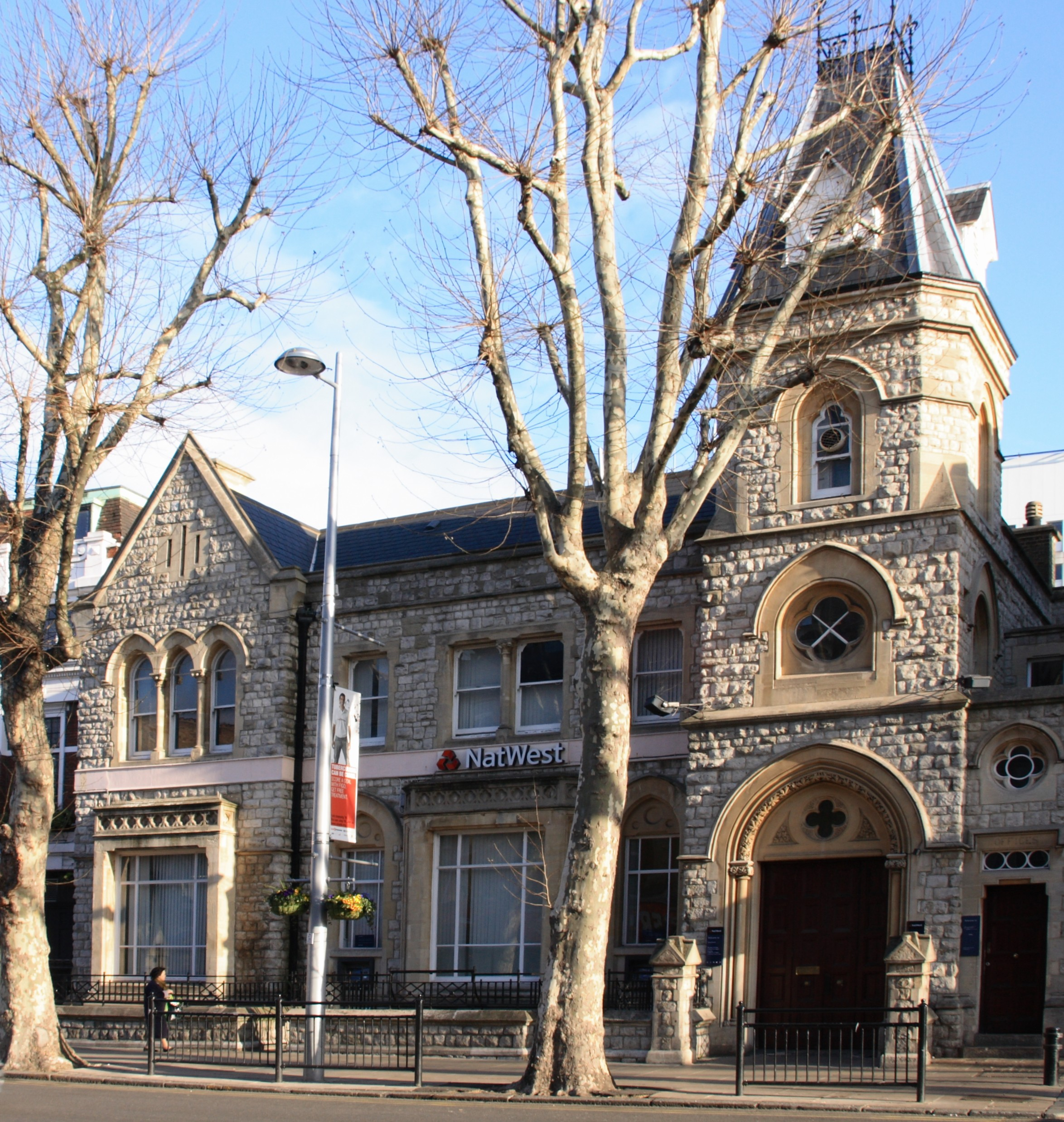
The old Town Hall at Ealing, London, built by Charles Jones in 1872, now a NatWest branch

In 1999, the chairman, Lord Alexander of Weedon, announced a merger with Legal & General in a friendly £10.7 billion deal, the first between a bank and an insurance company in UK history. The move was poorly received in the London financial markets and NatWest's share price fell substantially. Seen as a driver of the ill-advised investment banking expansion, Derek Wanless was forced to resign as chief executive following the appointment of Sir David Rowland (who became executive chairman). Also in 1999, in response to the much reduced NatWest market capitalisation, the much smaller Bank of Scotland made a hostile takeover bid for NatWest. The Bank of Scotland's aim was to break up the NatWest Group and dispose of its non-retail assets. NatWest was forced to abandon its merger, but refused to agree to a takeover by a rival bank. The Royal Bank of Scotland tabled another hostile offer, of £21 billion, outbidding the Bank of Scotland. The takeover of NatWest in early 2000 was the biggest in UK history. Once Britain's most profitable bank, it was delisted from the London Stock Exchange and became, with its subsidiaries, component parts of the Royal Bank of Scotland Group. The outcome of this bitter struggle set the tone for a round of consolidation in the financial sector as it prepared for a new age of fierce global competition. The Royal Bank of Scotland Group became the second-largest bank in the UK and Europe (after HSBC) and the fifth-largest in the world by market capitalisation. According to Forbes Global 2000, it was then the 13th-largest company in the world. NatWest was retained as a distinct brand with its own banking licence, but many back office functions were merged with those of the Royal Bank, leading to over 18,000 job losses.

=== Attempted divestment (2008–2017) ===
In 2008, it was announced that HM Government would take a stake of up to 58% in the Royal Bank of Scotland in a move aimed at recapitalising the group. HM Treasury subscribed for £5 billion in preference shares and underwrote the issuance of £15bn of new ordinary shares offered to RBS shareholders and new institutional shareholders at the fixed price of 65.5p. As a consequence of the mismanagement that necessitated this rescue, the chief executive, Fred Goodwin (who secured the takeover of NatWest), offered his resignation, which was duly accepted. Chairman Tom McKillop also confirmed he would stand down from that role when his contract expired in 2009. Goodwin was replaced by Stephen Hester, previously chief executive of British Land.

In 2009, the RBS Group announced that it would divest all 311 RBS branches in England and Wales (known as Williams & Glyn's until 1985) together with the seven NatWest branches in Scotland as a standalone business, to comply with European Commission state aid requirements. In August 2010, it was announced that the branches would be sold to Santander UK, along with the accounts of 1.8 million personal customers and 244,000 SME customers. Santander withdrew from the sale in October 2012. On 27 September 2013, the RBS Group confirmed it had agreed to sell 308 RBS branches in England and Wales and 6 NatWest branches in Scotland to the Corsair consortium. This figure was reduced to 307 by May 2015. The branches were to have been separated from the group in 2016 as a standalone business operating under the previously dormant Williams & Glyn brand.

In August 2016, RBS cancelled its plan to spin off Williams & Glyn as a separate business, stating that the new bank could not survive independently. It revealed it would instead seek to sell the division to another bank. In February 2017, HM Treasury and the European Commission reached a provisional agreement in which RBS would be able to retain the Williams & Glyn assets in return for investing £750 million into a fund aimed at increasing SME lending by challenger banks and for RBS agreeing to allow SME customers of challenger banks to use its branch network for cash and cheque handling. The European Commission confirmed in April 2017 that it would scrutinise the proposal.

=== Recent history (2017–present) ===
On 3 May 2021, the business of Ulster Bank Limited in Northern Ireland was transferred to National Westminster Bank as part of a court-approved Banking Business Transfer Scheme.

In June 2024, NatWest announced it had agreed a deal to acquire the majority of Sainsbury's Bank. The deal will see the company acquire one million customers, £2.5 billion of customer assets and £2.6 billion of customer deposits. NatWest will receive £125 million from the deal upon completion in the first half of 2025. In 2024, NatWest also entered into an agreement with Metro Bank plc ("Metro Bank") to acquire a £2.5 billion portfolio of prime UK residential mortgages, with a weighted average current loan to value of c.62%.

In November 2024, the bank bought back £1 billion of its own shares from the UK Treasury, reducing the British government’s stake to 11.4 per cent from 14.81 per cent. It acquired 263 million shares at 380.8p each.

Natwest acquired Evelyn Partners, a wealth management company in February 2026 for £2.7 billion. The deal increased the companies fee income by about 20%, although their share price fell on the day of the announcement.

In August 2026, was granted permission by the US Federal Reserve to set up a "representative office" in Connecticut that will "act as a liaison with current and prospective US customers of the bank".

== Structure ==
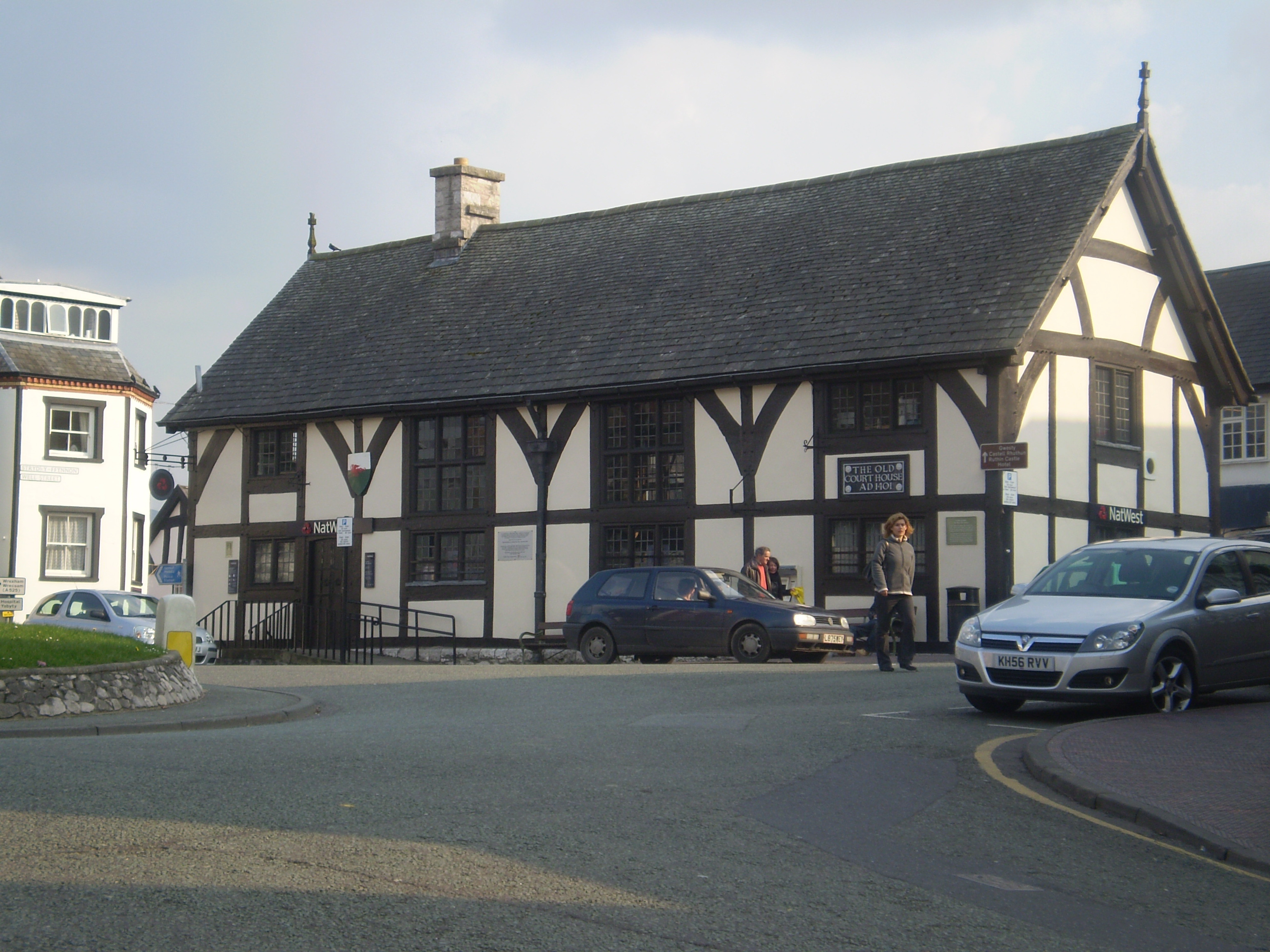
The old court house at Ruthin, Denbighshire, built in 1401, a NatWest branch until 2017

NatWest Group operates internationally through its four principal subsidiaries: NatWest Holdings which owns The Royal Bank of Scotland, National Westminster Bank and Ulster Bank Ireland DAC; NatWest Markets; NatWest Markets N.V.; and The Royal Bank of Scotland International. The NatWest sub-group of companies comprises National Westminster Bank and its subsidiary and associated undertakings. As of 2023, the principal subsidiary undertakings of NatWest are:

- Coutts & Co.
- RBS Invoice Finance
- Lombard North Central

Structurally, National Westminster Bank was a wholly owned subsidiary of The Royal Bank of Scotland Group until 2003, when ownership of the bank's entire issued ordinary share capital was transferred to The Royal Bank of Scotland as holding company, with RBS Group functioning as ultimate holding company. At the same time the entire issued share capital of Lombard North Central was transferred by the bank to the holding company, transferring back to NatWest in 2017. Ownership of National Westminster Home Loans was passed to the holding company in 2005; however, the mortgage portfolio and related funding were also transferred back to NatWest in 2012. In 2000, the bank transferred National Westminster Life Assurance to RBS Life Investments, effectively establishing the business as a joint venture between the Group and Norwich Union. In 2018, ownership of both NatWest and the Royal Bank transferred to NatWest Holdings and NatWest became the main provider of shared services and Treasury activities for the RBS Group. On 14 February 2020, it was announced that RBS Group would be renamed NatWest Group later that year, taking the brand under which the majority of its business was delivered. The change became effective on 22 July.

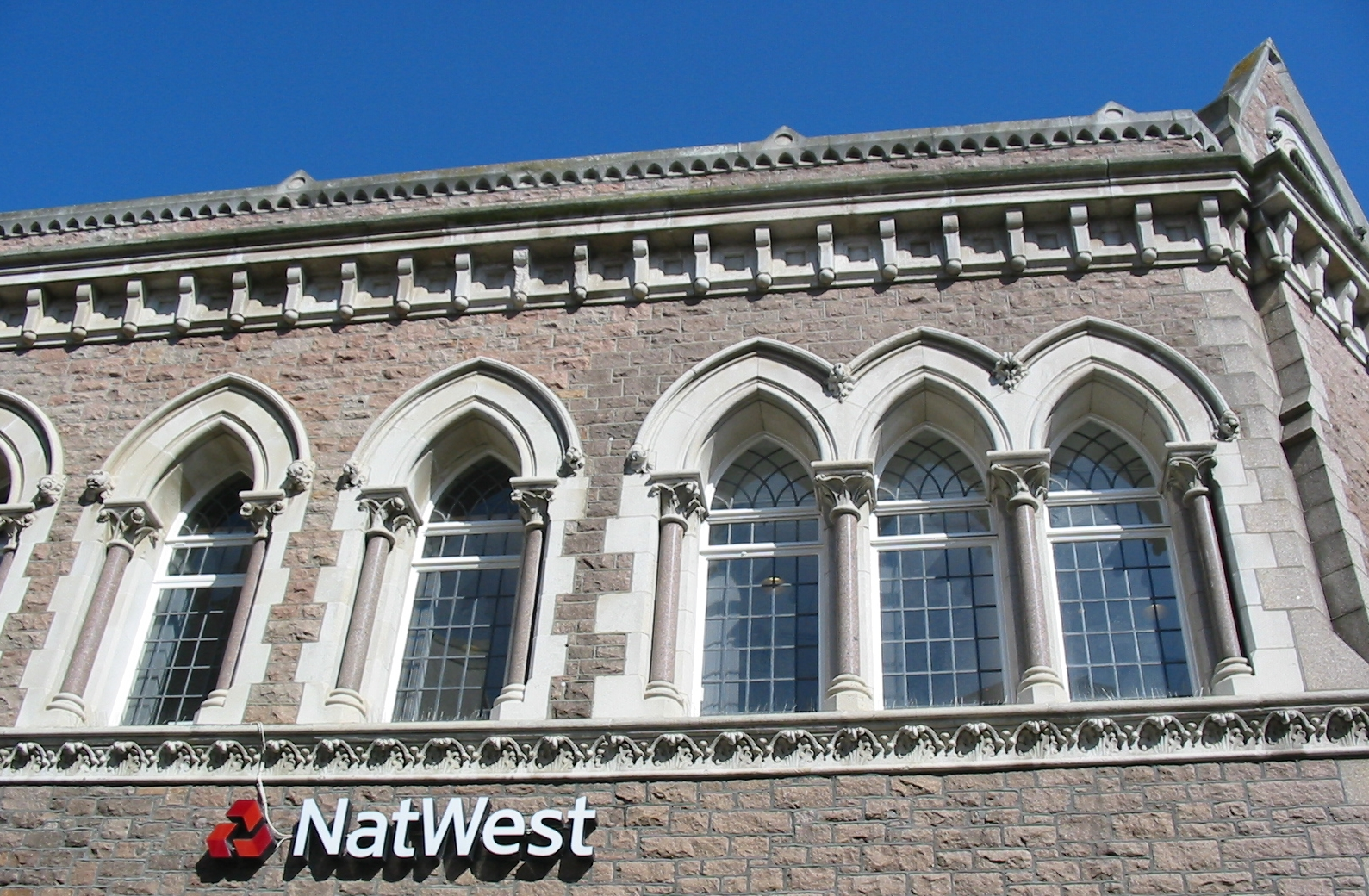
The NatWest branch at St Helier, capital of Jersey, Channel Islands, built in 1873

The following have served as chairmen of National Westminster Bank:

Tenure	Incumbent
1968–1969	Duncan Stirling
1969–1971	David Robarts
1971–1977	Sir John Prideaux
1977–1983	Robin Leigh-Pemberton, later the Lord Kingsdown
1983–1989	The Lord Boardman
1989–1999	The Lord Alexander of Weedon
1999–2000	Sir David Rowland

The office is currently held ex officio by the chair of NatWest Group.

== Services ==
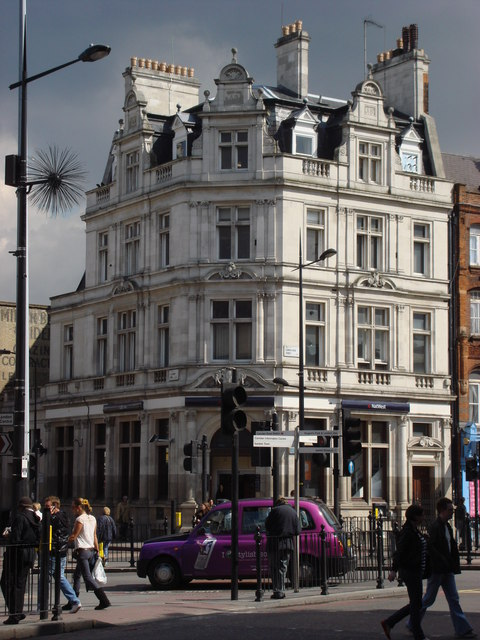
The NatWest branch at Camden Town, London, NW1

NatWest provides a full range of banking and insurance services to personal, business and commercial customers, including the first dedicated bank account in Britain to be delivered and supported entirely in the Polish language. The bank has won Your Mortgage Magazine's Best Bank for Mortgages award 13 times in the last 17 years, more than any other lender.

NatWest provides a digital assistant, Cora, to respond to customer enquiries. In 2023, it handled over 10 million queries. From 2025, the bank entered into a partnership with OpenAI, the first such collaboration by a UK bank, to enhance the chatbot's generative AI capabilities.

Operating under the name Esme Loans, NatWest provided a digital lending platform for SMEs also available to customers not banking with NatWest or RBS. Esme Loans commenced trading on 17 February 2017, after being founded out of the bank's new product development programme NatWest Innovation Cell by Richard Kerton, Veronika Lovett, and Lucy Hasson. Esme loans was closed in 2021.

The bank operates "mobile branches" using converted vans to serve rural areas around St Austell, Swansea, Carlisle, Devon and North Wales.

In 2006, the then RBS Group undertook the first trial of PayPass contactless debit and credit cards in Europe. In 2019, a NatWest pilot project was the first in the UK to trial debit cards containing fingerprint authentication technology developed by Dutch company, Gemalto.

The bank participates fully in the Faster Payments Service, an initiative to speed up certain payments, launched in 2008. The bank established credit and debit card payment handling company Streamline in 1989, which was merged into Worldpay Group in 2009. The NatWest Mobile Banking app is available to personal account holders over the age of 11 with online banking, a debit card and UK mobile telephone number (beginning 07). The Emergency Cash service gives access to cash without a debit card from NatWest, RBS and Ulster Bank cash machines.

NatWest is a member of the Cheque and Credit Clearing Company, Bankers' Automated Clearing Services, the Clearing House Automated Payment System and the LINK Interchange Network. The bank is authorised by the Prudential Regulation Authority and regulated by both the Financial Conduct Authority and the Prudential Regulation Authority. It is a member of the Financial Ombudsman Service, the Financial Services Compensation Scheme, UK Payments Administration and of the British Bankers' Association; and it subscribes to the Lending Code. Mortgages, available in England, Scotland and Wales only, are provided by National Westminster Home Loans, a member of the Council of Mortgage Lenders,

NatWest Insurance Services acts as intermediary and broker for general insurance, policies are underwritten by UK Insurance Limited. Life Protector and Guaranteed Bond products are provided by National Westminster Life Assurance.

The Royal Bank of Scotland International trades as NatWest International in Jersey, Guernsey, the Isle of Man and Gibraltar. In 2010, RBS Intermediary Partners was renamed NatWest Intermediary Solutions.

National Westminster Bank use the following series of six-digit sorting codes formatted into three pairs separated by hyphens:

Range	Note
01	Former District Bank
50-00 to 59–99	Former National Provincial Bank
55–91	In use by Isle of Man Bank
60-00 to 66–99	Former Westminster Bank
18	For use of Coutts & Co.
98	For use of Ulster Bank

International Bank Account Numbers take the form GBxx NWBK ssss ssaa aaaa aa, where x refers to two check digits, s to the branch sort code and a to the individual account number. The Bank Identifier Code, or SWIFT code, for NatWest (and Isle of Man Bank) is NWBKGB2L (8 digits) or NWBKGB2Lxxx (11 digits).

Bó, a standalone digital banking app with the aim of helping people save more money was launched in November 2019 and discontinued in May 2020.

NatWest also entered the merchant acquiring market by introducing Tyl in 2019. The proposition includes next business day settlement for card transactions.

== Controversy ==
=== Litigation ===
The so-called NatWest Three—Giles Darby, David Bermingham and Gary Mulgrew—were extradited to the United States in 2006 on charges relating to a transaction with Enron Corporation in 2000 while they were working for Greenwich NatWest. It has been argued that the alleged crime was committed by British citizens living in the UK against a British company based in London and therefore, any resulting criminal case falls under the jurisdiction of the English courts. However, the Serious Fraud Office decided not to prosecute due to lack of evidence. There has been criticism that the Americans do not have to produce a prima facie case, or even a reasonable one, to extradite British citizens, whereas no such facility exists to extradite US citizens to the UK. On 28 November 2007 the three admitted one charge of wire fraud after a plea bargain. On 22 February 2008 they were each sentenced to 37 months in prison.

Following discussions between the Office of Fair Trading, the Financial Ombudsman Service, the Financial Services Authority and the major banks, proceedings were issued on 27 July 2007 in a test case against the banks to determine the legality and enforceability of certain charges relating to unauthorised overdrafts. It is argued that these are contrary to the Unfair Terms in Consumer Contracts Regulations 1999; Schedule 2(e) of which gives a non-exhaustive list of terms which may be regarded as unfair, such as a term requiring a consumer who fails in his obligation to pay a disproportionately high sum in compensation. Penalty charges are irrecoverable at common law. The precedent for this was Dunlop Pneumatic Tyre Co. Ltd. v New Garage and Motor Co. Ltd. [1915] AC 79 along with Murray v Leisure Play [2005] EWCA Civ 963, where it was held that a contractual party can only recover damages for an actual loss or liquidated losses. The RBS Group maintained that its charges were fair and enforceable and stated it intended to defend its position vigorously. On 24 April 2008, the High Court found that although these charges could not constitute penalties, they are challengeable under the Unfair Contract Terms Act 1977 and the Unfair Terms in Consumer Contracts Regulations 1999. On 26 February 2009, the Court of Appeal ruled that fees for unauthorised overdrafts and bounced cheques are subject to regulation by the OFT under these rules.

In September 2009, NatWest announced dramatic cuts in their overdraft fees. The unpaid item fee was reduced to £5 from £38 and the card misuse fee was reduced from £35 to £15. The cuts came at a time when the row over the legality of unauthorised borrowing, estimated to earn current account providers about £2.6 billion a year, had reached the House of Lords.

=== Computer failures ===
In late June 2012, the group suffered a major computer malfunction, resulting in some customers' account balances not updating correctly. Completions of some new home purchases were delayed, customers were stranded abroad, and one man was held in prison. As a result of the error, RBS and NatWest announced that over 1,200 of their busiest branches would extend their hours throughout the week, including the bank's first Sunday opening, to enable the customers affected to access cash. On 25 June, over 1,000 branches opened for extended hours, and the number of phone staff was doubled.

Some customers also reported problems with direct debits and standing orders being returned unpaid due to their account balances not updating correctly. However, RBS stated in an announcement that they would work directly with the receiving banks and companies to ensure that all payments were processed. As a result of the system outage, RBS also announced that they would work with credit rating agencies directly to ensure no customer's credit file was permanently impacted. They also announced that no customer would be permanently out of pocket because of the system outage, and launched a dedicated new freephone helpline for the incident, as well as an online help point to guide and advise customers with any queries they had during the outage.

In December 2013, a similar computer failure led to a number of customers being unable to use NatWest card services to pay for goods. This second major outage of services fell on what is known as Cyber Monday, when major retailers discount goods to boost Christmas shopping. The Group chief executive at the time conceded that the bank would have "to do better".

=== "Global laundromat" ===
On 20 March 2017, the British paper The Guardian reported that hundreds of banks had helped launder KGB-related funds out of Russia, as uncovered by an investigation named Global Laundromat. NatWest was listed among the 17 banks in the UK that were "facing questions over what they knew about the international scheme and why they did not turn away suspicious money transfers," as the bank processed $1.1 million in Laundromat cash. Other banks facing scrutiny under the investigation included HSBC, the Royal Bank of Scotland, Lloyds Bank, Barclays and Coutts.

=== Money laundering conviction ===
In December 2021, the bank was convicted at Westminster Magistrates' Court of three counts of failing to comply with anti–money laundering regulations, marking the first time that the Financial Conduct Authority had pursued criminal charges against a financial institution for failings in combating money laundering. NatWest pleaded guilty to the three counts, which concerned a jewellers, Fowler Oldfield, depositing £365 million between 2012 and 2016 of which £264 million was in cash, despite predicted annual turnover of £15 million. FCA lawyers stated that large volumes of cash were deposited in black bin bags, and that the quantity of notes failed to fit within the branch vaults.

In a statement, a spokesman for the Financial Conduct Authority said "'NatWest is responsible for a catalogue of failures in the way it monitored and scrutinised transactions that were self-evidently suspicious. Combined with serious systems failures, like the treatment of cash deposits as cheques, these failures created an open door for money laundering."

== Sponsorship ==
The name NatWest has been associated with cricket tournaments held in England. From 1981 until 2000, the bank was the title sponsor of English domestic cricket's main limited overs knockout tournament, which was known as the NatWest Trophy during that period. Between 2000 and 2013, the NatWest Series was an annual one-day international tournament involving England and two visiting international teams. NatWest was also a main sponsor of the 1999 Cricket World Cup, held in England. Since May 2017, it has been the shirt sponsor for the England men's and women's cricket teams.

NatWest was the main sponsor of the Island Games (known at the time as the NatWest Island Games) from 1998 through to 2019.

NatWest CommunityForce is "a platform that empowers local projects and charities to raise awareness of their work and make their plans a reality with the support of NatWest and their local community."

== See also ==
- Nestle v National Westminster Bank plc
- Re Spectrum Plus Ltd
- Tournier v National Provincial and Union Bank of England
- Office of Fair Trading v Abbey National plc
