= Paul Thwaite =

British banker (born 1971)

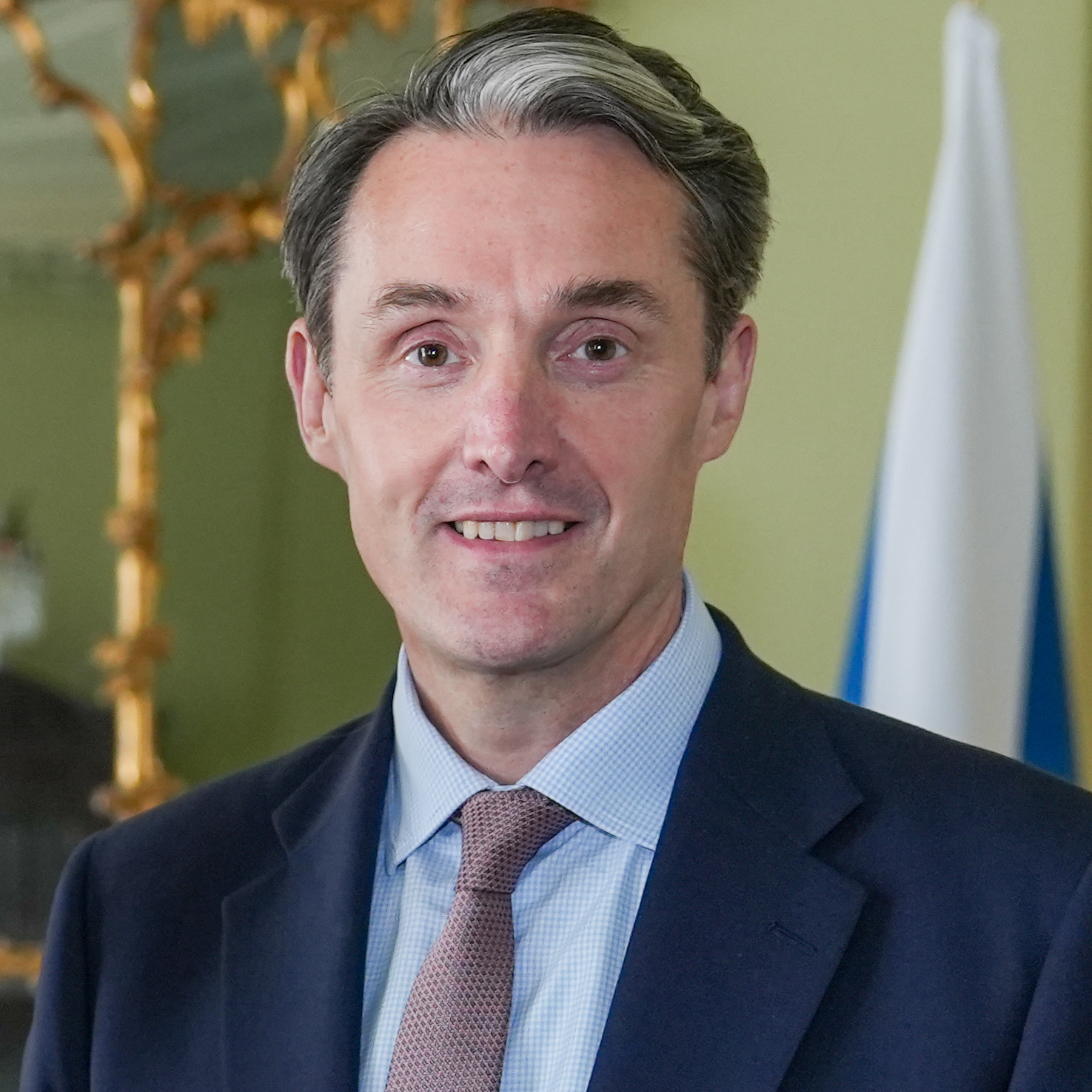
- Thwaite in 2025
- Born: 1971 (age 54–55)
- Education: University of Manchester
- Occupation: Banker
- Title: Chief Executive, NatWest Group
- Term: 2024–present
- Predecessor: Alison Rose (banker)

Paul Thwaite (born 1971) is a British banker. He has been the chief executive of NatWest Group since July 2023.

== Biography ==
Thwaite was born in Liverpool, England and educated at the Liverpool Blue Coat School in Wavertree. He studied at the University of Manchester.

Thwaite has worked at NatWest since 1997 and has held a number of roles across the company. Before taking up the role as chief executive of the group in July 2023, he was chief executive of NatWest's Commercial and Institutional Business division. In July 2023, Thwaite was appointed interim chief executive of NatWest following the resignation of Alison Rose. On 16 February 2024, Thwaite formally became the permanent chief executive of NatWest. Thwaite has also held senior roles within other banks across the UK, Europe and the US.
