= Lloyds Bank California =

- Type: Subsidiary undertaking
- Industry: Financial services
- Predecessor: First Western Bank and Trust
- Founded: 1974; 52 years ago
- Defunct: 1986; 40 years ago
- Successor: Sanwa Bank California
- Headquarters: Los Angeles, California, United States
- Parent: Lloyds Bank Plc

Lloyds Bank California was a wholly owned subsidiary of Lloyds Bank Plc in the United Kingdom from 1974 to 1986. Throughout its existence, the U.S. retail banking operation functioned as an autonomous unit of the Lloyds Bank Group, alongside Lloyds Bank International and the National Bank of New Zealand.

Lloyds Bank California was a commercial bank with a state charter, headquartered in Los Angeles, supervised by the Federal Deposit Insurance Corporation. Formerly the First Western Bank and Trust Company, which traced its origins to 1808, it was sold to Golden State Sanwa Bank in 1986.

== History ==
=== 1970s ===
In 1974, London-based Lloyds Bank Limited acquired the 94-branch First Western Bank and Trust Company from World Airways, Inc. of Oakland, California, at a price of US$115 million. The Delaware-registered holding company, Lloyds First Western Corporation, was formed to facilitate the purchase. In accordance with the Group's policy of non-participation in consortium banks, Lloyds Bank California relinquished its holding in London Interstate Bank in 1975.

First Western, a state-chartered bank which traced its history back to 1808, had been owned by World Airways since 1968, when its assets were approximately $900 million. At the time of the acquisition by Lloyds Bank, it ranked eighth-largest among Californian banks with assets of $1.3 billion.

Further expansion occurred in 1976, when Lloyds Bank California acquired First State Bank of Northern California, which had been formed in San Leandro in 1962, adding another four branches which were rapidly integrated to the network.

During the course of 1977, Lloyds Bank California developed two programs to expand its field of activities and add to the services offered to customers. It entered into the equipment leasing business to take advantage of the rapidly expanding volume of industrial equipment leasing which had occurred within the U.S. and also completed preparations to establish a mortgage banking department, to engage in the growing residential mortgage market by making long-term mortgage loans to be sold to institutional investors and serviced by the Bank.

The Bank opened its 100th branch office in 1979 and commenced work on a new computer and operations center, designed to accommodate 900 staff, enabling the centralization of many of its support functions. In order to meet the need of the local market, drive-up cashier tills were long incorporated into the design of many of its offices. This service was available at more than 50 per cent of branches, many of which had multiple lanes, with up to 40 per cent of the business at a branch conducted at a drive-up window. In 1979, Lloyds Bank California also installed its first online cash dispensers at branches in the San Francisco area.

=== 1980s ===
Plans to enter the growing markets of San Jose in northern California and Newport Beach in the south finally materialized in 1980. In addition, several offices were re-located, including the northern California administrative headquarters in San Francisco. By the end of the year, a new 205,000-square-foot operations center in the center of the Los Angeles financial district was fully functional, reflecting the Bank's growing importance. The operations center began automation, converting all systems to the IBM computer in 1981, and, by early 1982, the Bank's ATM network was doubled in capacity.

Business was boosted by the Lloyds Privilege Banking program in 1983, a package of revolving lines of credit, investment facilities and advice, pension and retirement savings plans, financial planning and trust services and real estate and home loans. Changes in banking regulations and advances in technology gave customers access to a whole range of financial products from a single source. Lloyds Bank California joined with 11 other financial companies in 1984, as founder members of the Star System ATM network and computerization made possible a new personalized financial planning package for wealthy people.

In 1985, Lloyds Bank announced its intention to dispose of the share capital of Lloyds Bank California, which had produced below-average returns for the Group, deciding to concentrate its resources in the U.S. on its successful and profitable corporate business, based in New York. Lloyds Bank California's 88 branches and $3 billion in assets was divested to Japanese-owned Golden State Sanwa Bank for a $263 million cash consideration in 1986, to form Sanwa Bank California. Sanwa Bank KK had established an agency in California in 1953 and a subsidiary in 1972. It acquired Charter Bank in 1973 and merged with Golden State Bank, one of the oldest financial institutions in California, in 1978. In 2001, Sanwa Bank California acquired Tokai Bank of California becoming United California Bank, before being merged into and subsequently operated as part of Bank of the West from 2002.

== See also ==
- Bank of London and South America
- Bank of London and Montreal
- Lloyds Bank Canada
- Sabadell Solbank
