= Lloyds Bank Canada =

British-owned Canadian subsidiary bank (1986-1990)

Lloyds Bank Canada Banque Lloyds du Canada
- Type: Subsidiary undertaking
- Industry: Financial services
- Predecessor: Continental Bank of Canada
- Founded: 1986; 40 years ago
- Defunct: 1990; 36 years ago
- Successor: Hongkong Bank of Canada
- Headquarters: Toronto, Ontario, Canada
- Parent: Lloyds Bank Plc

Lloyds Bank Canada was a wholly owned Canadian subsidiary of Lloyds Bank Plc of the United Kingdom from 1986 to 1990. Its headquarters were in Toronto, and it had 53 branches throughout Canada. It functioned as a member of the Lloyds Bank Group, whose overseas domestic banking interests also included the National Bank of New Zealand.

Lloyds Bank International opened two new offices in Canada in 2009, offering its international mortgage.

== History ==
Lloyds Bank Canada was chartered in 1986, when Lloyds Bank acquired 90 per cent of the assets and most of the liabilities of the Continental Bank of Canada. Continental Bank had been formed earlier in the 1980s, when Niagara Finance Company, later IAC Limited, decided to expand the scope of operations.

In 1989, after several years of losses, agreement was reached for the sale of Lloyds Bank's interest in the whole of the issued share capital of the Canadian operation to the Hongkong Bank of Canada, a subsidiary of London-based HSBC Holdings, for a consideration of CAD 190 million. In 1999, HBC changed its name to HSBC Bank Canada, consistent with its parent's strategy of creating a global brand.

== See also ==
- Bank of London and South America
- Bank of London and Montreal
- Lloyds Bank California
- Sabadell Solbank
