= Lloyds Bank (disambiguation) =

Lloyds Bank is a retail bank in the United Kingdom established in 1765, known as Lloyds TSB from 1998 to 2013

Lloyds Bank can also refer to:

- Lloyds Banking Group, formed in 2009 from the acquisition of HBOS by Lloyds TSB
- Lloyds Bank of Canada, existed from 1986 to 1990
- Lloyds Bank International, subsidiary of Lloyds Bank plc operating outside of the UK
- Lloyds Bank, Bristol, grade II listed building
