= HBOS =

British banking and insurance company

HBOS plc
- Type: Subsidiary
- Industry: Finance and insurance
- Founded: 2000; 26 years ago
- Fate: Acquired by Lloyds TSB, Remains as an active legal entity (Intermediate holding company for Bank of Scotland and its trading name Halifax, which is in the current phases of being integrated into Lloyds Bank in 2026)
- Headquarters: Edinburgh, Scotland, UK (Registered office); Halifax, England, UK (Head Office)
- Key people: James Crosby & Andy Hornby (former Chief Executives); Lord Stevenson of Coddenham (chairman)
- Products: Financial services
- Number of employees: 72,000
- Parent: Lloyds Banking Group
- Subsidiaries: Bank of Scotland plc, HBOS Australia, HBOS Insurance & Investment Group
- Footnotes; The Lloyds Banking Group domain originally hosted a temporary landing page prior to its official launch in mid-January 2009.

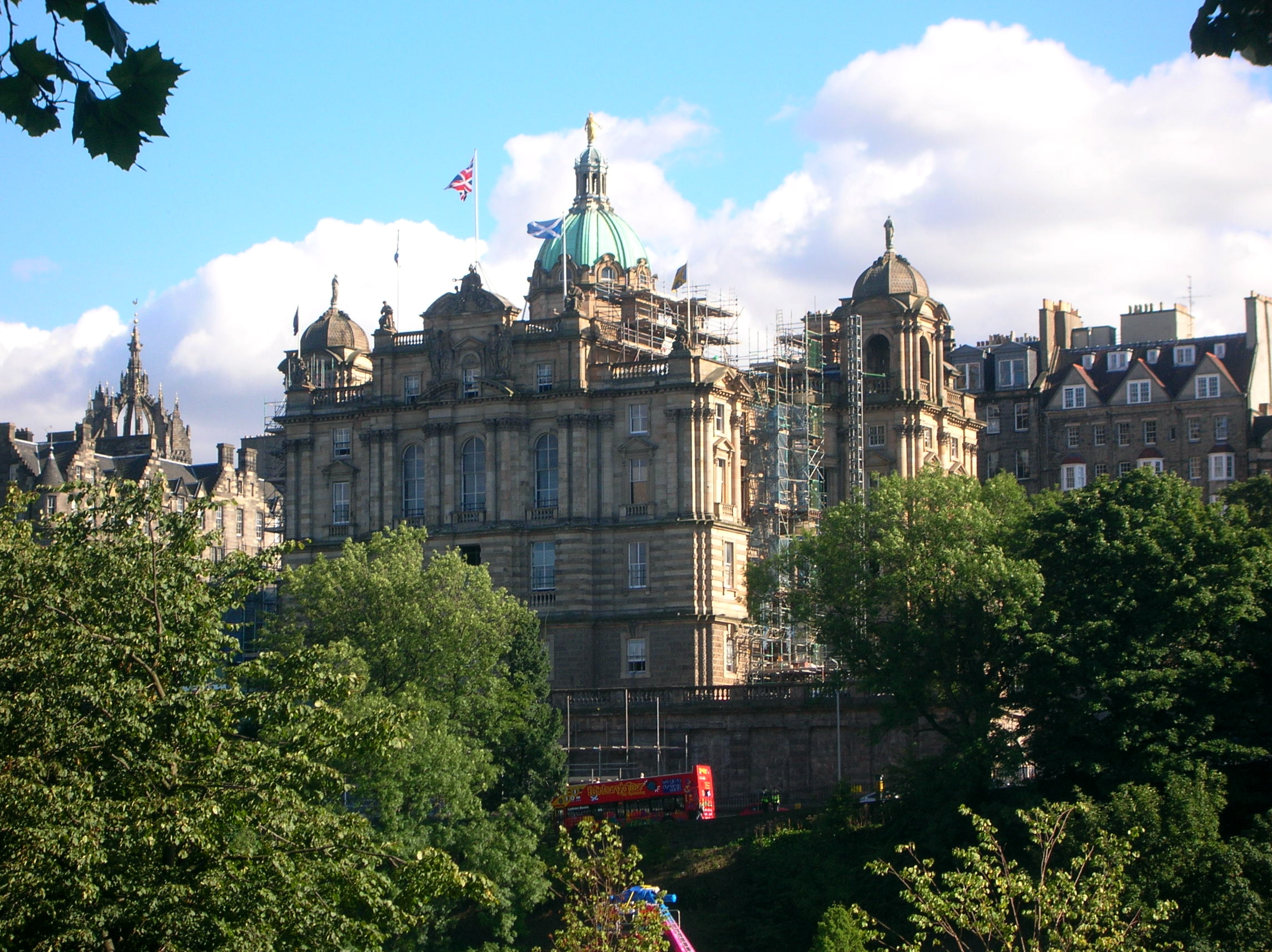
Group headquarters on The Mound, Edinburgh

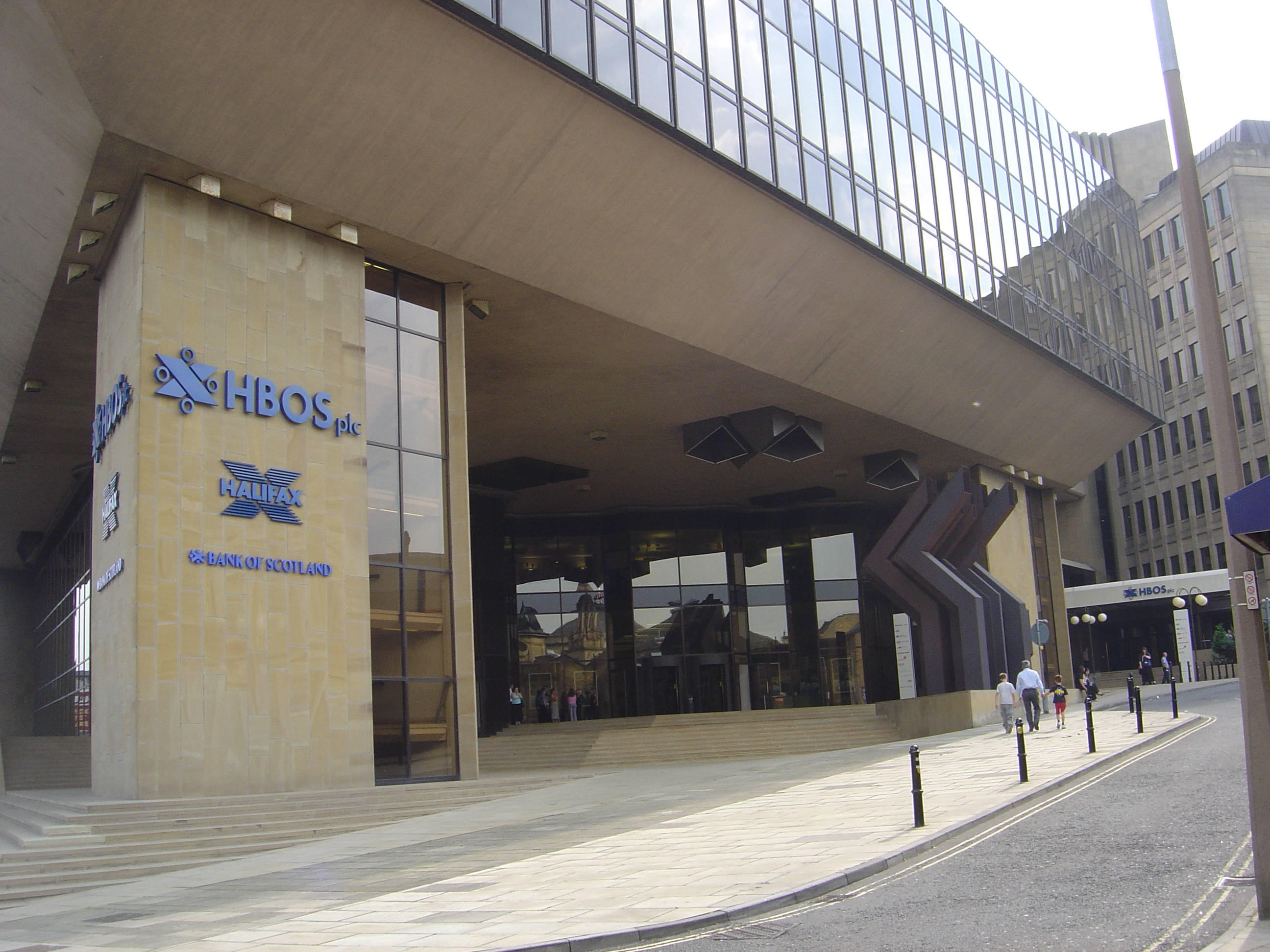
HBOS Office at Trinity Road, Halifax

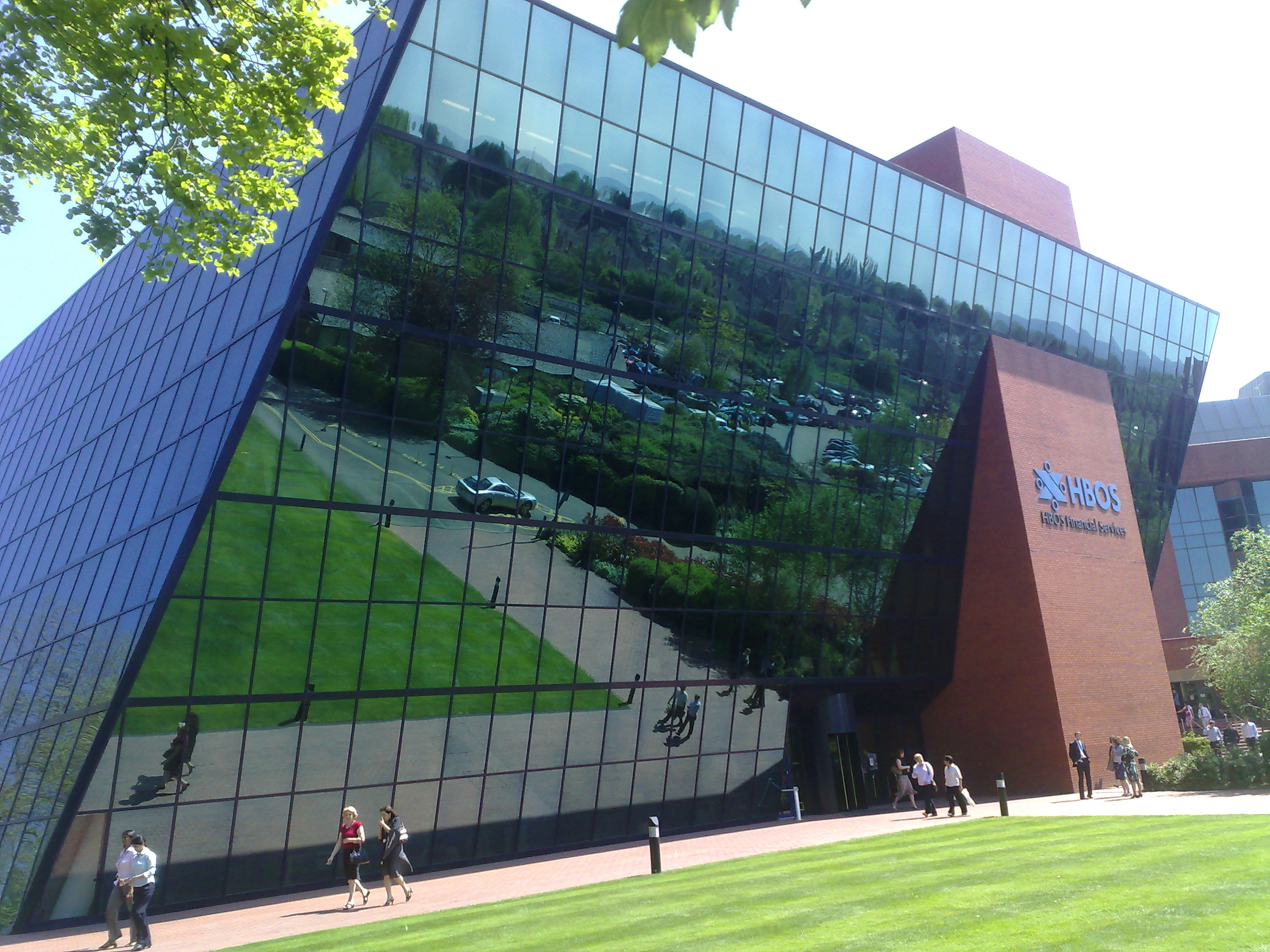
Halifax offices in Aylesbury, Buckinghamshire

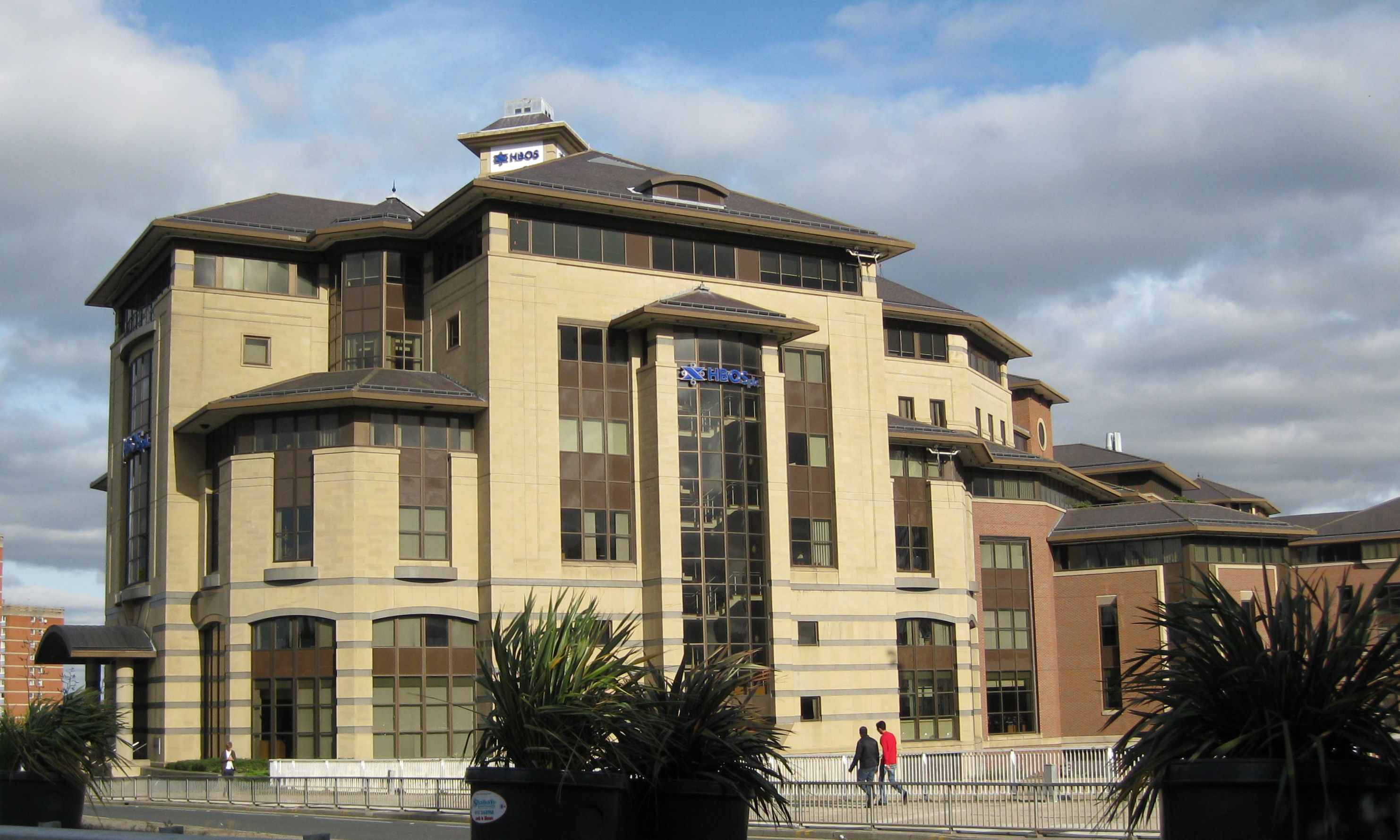
HBOS offices in Lovell Park, Leeds, formerly those of the Leeds Permanent Building Society before its takeover by the Halifax Building Society

HBOS plc (an abbreviation of Halifax-Bank of Scotland) was a banking and insurance company in the United Kingdom, now a wholly owned subsidiary of the Lloyds Banking Group, having been taken over in January 2009. It is the holding company for Bank of Scotland plc, which operated the Bank of Scotland and Halifax brands in the UK, as well as HBOS Australia and HBOS Insurance & Investment Group Limited, the group's insurance division.

HBOS was formed by the 2001 merger of Halifax plc and the Bank of Scotland. The formation of HBOS was heralded as creating a fifth force in British banking as it created a company of comparable size and stature to the established Big Four UK retail banks. It was also the UK's largest mortgage lender. The HBOS Group Reorganisation Act 2006 saw the transfer of Halifax plc and Capital Bank plc to the Bank of Scotland, which had by then become a registered public limited company, Bank of Scotland plc.

Although officially HBOS was not an acronym of any specific words, it is widely presumed to stand for Halifax Bank of Scotland. The corporate headquarters of the group were located on The Mound in Edinburgh, Scotland, the former head office of the Bank of Scotland. Its operational headquarters were in Halifax, West Yorkshire, England, the former head office of Halifax.

On 19 January 2009, the group was acquired by Lloyds TSB and became a subsidiary of Lloyds Banking Group after both sets of shareholders approved the deal.

Lloyds Banking Group stated that the new group would continue to use The Mound as the headquarters for its Scottish operations and would continue the issue of Scottish bank notes.

== History ==
HBOS was formed by a merger of Halifax and Bank of Scotland in 2001, Halifax having demutualised and floated four years prior.

=== HBOS Group Reorganisation Act 2006 ===
In 2006, HBOS secured the passing of the HBOS Group Reorganisation Act 2006 (c. i), a local act of Parliament that rationalised the bank's corporate structure. The act allowed HBOS to make the Governor and Company of the Bank of Scotland a public limited company, Bank of Scotland plc, which became the principal banking subsidiary of HBOS. Halifax plc and Capital Bank plc transferred its undertakings to Bank of Scotland plc. The Halifax brand name was retained; Halifax then began to operate under the latter's UK banking licence.

The provisions in the act were implemented on 17 September 2007.

The share price peaked at over 1150p in February 2007.

=== 2008 short selling and credit crunch ===
In 2004, Paul Moore, HBOS head of Group Regulatory Risk, warned senior directors at HBOS about excessive risk-taking. He was dismissed, and his concerns not acted on.

In March 2008, HBOS shares fell 17 percent amid false rumours that it had asked the Bank of England for emergency funding. The Financial Services Authority conducted an investigation as to whether short selling had any links with the rumours. It concluded that there was no deliberate attempt to drive the share price down.

On 17 September 2008, very shortly after the demise of Lehman Brothers, HBOS's share price suffered wild fluctuations between 88p and 220p per share, despite the FSA's assurances as to its liquidity and exposure to the wider credit crunch.

However, later that day, the BBC reported that HBOS was in advanced takeover talks with Lloyds TSB to create a "superbank" with 38 million customers. That was later confirmed by HBOS. The BBC suggested that shareholders would be offered up to £3.00 per share, causing the share price to rise, but later retracted that comment. Later that day, the price was set at 0.83 Lloyds shares for each HBOS share, equivalent to 232p per share, which was less than the 275p price at which HBOS had raised funds earlier in 2008. The price was later altered to 0.605 Lloyds shares per HBOS share.

To avoid another Northern Rock-style collapse, the UK government announced that should the takeover go ahead, it would be allowed to bypass competition law.

Alex Salmond, Scotland's First Minister, previously an economist, said of the takeover:

"I am very angry that we can have a situation where a bank can be forced into a merger by basically a bunch of short-selling spivs and speculators in the financial markets."

=== Acquisition by Lloyds TSB ===
On 18 September 2008, the terms of the recommended offer for HBOS by Lloyds TSB were announced. The deal was concluded on 19 January 2009. The three main conditions for the acquisition were:

- Three quarters of HBOS shareholders voted in favour of the board's actions;
- Half of Lloyds TSB shareholder voted to approve the takeover;
- UK government dispensation with respect to competition law.

A group of Scottish businessmen challenged the right of the UK government to approve the deal by over-ruling UK competition law, but this was rejected. The takeover was approved by HBOS shareholders on 12 December.

Prime Minister Gordon Brown personally brokered the deal with Lloyds TSB. An official said: "It is not the role of a Prime Minister to tell a City institution what to do". The Lloyds TSB board stated that merchant banks Merrill Lynch and Morgan Stanley were among the advisers recommending the takeover.

Lloyds Banking Group said Edinburgh-based HBOS, which it had absorbed in January, made a pre-tax loss of £10.8 billion in 2008. Andy Hornby, the former chief executive of HBOS, and Lord Stevenson of Coddenham, its former chairman, appeared before the Commons Treasury Committee to answer questions about the near-collapse of the bank. Hornby said: "I'm very sorry what happened at HBOS. It has affected shareholders, many of whom are colleagues, it's affected the communities in which we live and serve, it's clearly affected taxpayers, and we are extremely sorry for the turn of events that has brought it about."

To this day, HBOS continues to exist as an active legal entity. It now functions as an intermediate holding company within Lloyds Banking Group, primarily for Bank of Scotland plc and Halifax, with its own annual reports.

=== Bailout ===
On 13 October 2008, Gordon Brown's announcement that government must be a "rock of stability" resulted to an "unprecedented but essential" government action: the Treasury would infuse £37 billion ($64 billion, €47 billion) of new capital into Royal Bank of Scotland Group Plc, Lloyds TSB and HBOS Plc, to avert financial sector collapse or UK "banking meltdown". He stressed that it was not "standard public ownership", as the banks would return to private investors "at the right time". The Chancellor of the Exchequer, Alistair Darling, claimed that the British public would benefit from the rescue plan, because the government would have some control over RBS in exchange for about £20 billion of funding. Total State ownership in RBS would be 60%, and 40% for HBOS. Royal Bank of Scotland said it intended to raise £20 billion ($34 billion) capital with the government's aid; its chief executive Fred Goodwin resigned. The government acquired $8.6 billion of preference shares and underwrote $25.7 billion of ordinary shares. Thus, it intended to raise £15 billion (€18.9 billion, $25.8 billion) from investors, to be underwritten by the government. The State would pay £5 billion for RBS, while Barclays Bank raised £6.5 billion from private sector investors, with no government help. Reuters reported that Britain could inject £40 billion ($69 billion) into the three banks including Barclays.

=== Investigation ===
In 2015, an investigation by the Prudential Regulation Authority and Financial Conduct Authority blamed the failure requiring the bailout on the bank's executives, as well as being critical of the Financial Services Authority (FSA), the then-regulator. A parallel investigation into the FSA's enforcement process concluded it was too late to fine responsible executives, but up to 10 former HBOS executives could be banned from the financial services industry.

Causes of failure were identified as follows:

- The board failed to instil a culture within the firm that balanced risk and return appropriately, and it lacked sufficient experience and knowledge of banking.
- There was a flawed and unbalanced strategy and a business model with inherent vulnerabilities arising from an excessive focus on market share, asset growth and short-term profitability.
- The firm's executive management pursued rapid and uncontrolled growth of the Group's balance sheet. That led to an over-exposure to highly cyclical commercial real estate (CRE) at the peak of the economic cycle.
- The board and control functions failed to challenge effectively the pursuit of that course by the executive management, or to ensure adequate mitigating actions.
- The underlying weaknesses of HBOS's balance sheet made the Group extremely vulnerable to market shocks and eventual failure as the crisis in the financial system intensified.

After putting the investigation on hold in 2013, in April 2017, the Financial Conduct Authority resumed its probe of "the way HBOS handled fraud allegations at its Reading branch".

On 21 June 2019, the Financial Conduct Authority fined the Bank of Scotland £45.5 million over its failure to report suspicions of fraud at its Reading branch which led to the jailing of six people. The authority said that the bank "risked substantial prejudice to the interests of justice" by withholding information. The fine was reduced by almost £20 million because the bank agreed to settle.

== Controversies ==
=== Links to the arms trade ===
In December 2008, the British anti-poverty charity, War on Want, released a report documenting the extent to which HBOS and other UK commercial banks invested in, provided banking services for, and made loans to arms companies. The charity wrote that HBOS held shares in the UK arms sector totalling £483.4 million, and served as principal banker for Babcock International and Chemring.

=== Mortgage fraud ===
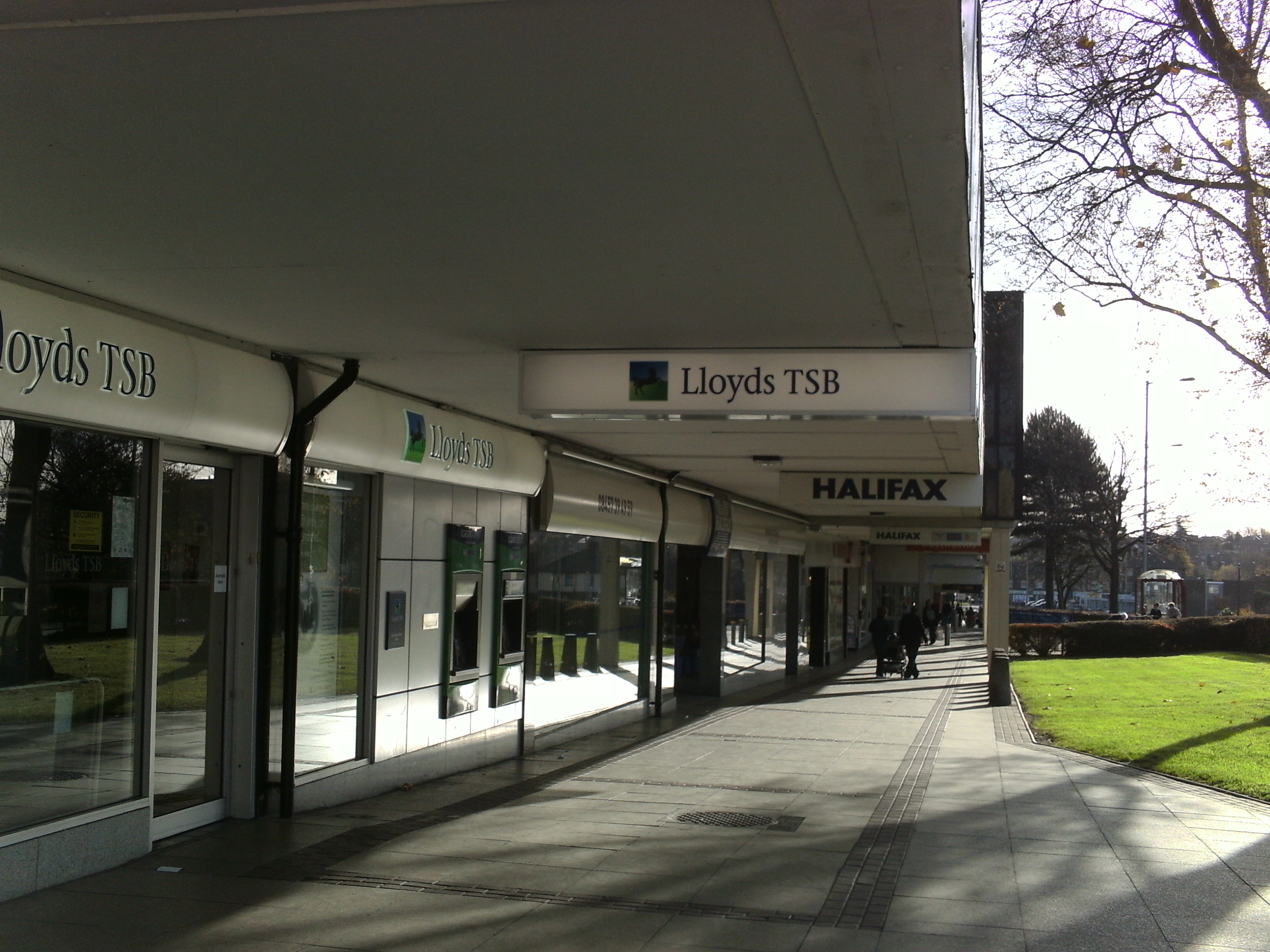
Neighbouring Halifax and Lloyds TSB branches outside Crossgates Shopping Centre, Cross Gates, Leeds

During 2003, The Money Programme uncovered systemic mortgage fraud throughout HBOS. The Money Programme found that during the investigation, brokers advised the undercover researchers to lie on applications for self-certified mortgages from, among others, the Bank of Scotland, the Mortgage Business and Birmingham Midshires. All three were part of the Halifax Bank of Scotland Group, Britain's biggest mortgage lender. James Crosby, head of HBOS at the time, refused to be interviewed in relation to the exposed mortgage fraud. Further examples of mortgage fraud have come to light, which has seen mortgage brokers take advantage of fast track processing systems, as seen at HBOS, by entering false details, often without the applicant's knowledge.

=== Bank of Wales ===
In 2002, HBOS dropped the Bank of Wales brand and absorbed the operations into Bank of Scotland Business Banking.

=== HBOS bad loans ===
On 13 February 2009, Lloyds Banking Group revealed losses of £10 billion at HBOS, £1.6 billion higher than Lloyds had anticipated in November because of deterioration in the housing market and weakening company profits. The share price of Lloyds Banking Group plunged 32% on the London Stock Exchange, carrying other bank shares with it.

In September 2012, Peter Cummings, the head of HBOS corporate banking from 2006 to 2008, was fined £500,000 by the UK financial regulator over his role in the bank's collapse. The Financial Services Authority (FSA) also banned Cummings from working in the banking industry. The losses in his division exceeded the initial taxpayer bailout for the bank in October 2008.

=== Reading branch fraud and Operation Hornet ===
On 3 October 2010, Lynden Scourfield, former director of mid-market high-risk at Bank of Scotland Corporate, his wife Jacquie Scourfield, ex-director of Remnant Media Tony Cartwright, and ex-NatWest banker David Mills, were arrested on suspicion of fraud by the Serious Organised Crime Agency. The scandal centred around Scourfield's use of his position to refer companies to Quayside Corporate Services, owned and operated by David Mills, for "turnaround" services which Quayside was unqualified to provide. Several members of Quayside's staff had criminal records for embezzlement. Customers were allegedly inappropriately pressured to take on excessive debt burdens and to make acquisitions benefiting Quayside.

On 30 January 2017, following a four-month trial, former HBOS employees Scourfield and Mark Dobson were convicted of corruption and fraud involving a scheme that cost the bank £245 million; Scourfield pleaded guilty to six counts including corruption, and Dobson was found guilty of counts including bribery, fraud and money laundering. The court also convicted David Mills, Michael Bancroft, Alison Mills, and John Cartwright for their parts in the conspiracy. On 2 February 2017, David Mills was jailed for 15 years, Scourfield for 11 years and three months, and Bancroft for 10 years. Dobson was sentenced to four and a half years, and Alison Mills and Cartwright were given three-and-a-half-year sentences for money laundering. Following the convictions, the BBC reported:

"Businessmen Bancroft and Mills arranged sex parties, exotic foreign holidays, cash in brown envelopes and other favours for Scourfield between 2003 and 2007. In exchange for the bribes, Scourfield would require the bank's small business customers to use Quayside Corporate Services, the firm of consultants run by Mills and his wife Alison. Quayside purported to be turnaround consultants, offering business experience and expertise to help small business customers improve their fortunes, but far from helping turn businesses around, Mills and his associates were milking them for huge fees and using their relationship with the bank to bully business owners and strip them of their assets. In cash fees alone, according to prosecutors in the trial, £28 million went through the accounts of Mills, his wife and their associated companies. […] Mills and his associates used the bank's customers and the bank's money dishonestly to enrich themselves."

The police investigation, named Operation Hornet, was carried out by Thames Valley Police, whilst Anthony Stansfeld was PCC. When the trial ended, Mr Stansfeld made the following three observations. Firstly, the investigation took six years at a cost of £7m. Secondly, that a fraud of that size could not have taken place without either complicity or incompetence, or a lack of oversight. Lastly, that if Thames Valley Police had not taken on the case no one else would have, and the crime would not have been investigated.

The BBC added: "A decade on, HBOS's owner Lloyds Banking Group still has not acknowledged the full scale of the fraud - or offered to compensate its victims"; the broadcaster noted that the fraud was first discovered in 2007 by the bank's customers Nikki and Paul Turner, who used publicly available records to uncover it, but that after the Turners submitted their evidence to the bank it dismissed their claims and tried to repossess their home. Following the convictions, the background to the case was reported on BBC Radio 4's File on 4 programme on 31 January 2017. Lloyds is taking a £100 million hit paying compensation to the victims.

Noel Edmonds, a celebrity victim of the scam, reached a settlement with the bank in July 2019. Edmonds had argued that staff at the Reading branch had ruined his business, the Unique Group. Edmonds' campaign against Lloyds included attending the Lloyds 2018 AGM where he berated the board of directors from the floor. In July 2022, insider.co.uk reported that Thames Valley Police has referred Noel Edmonds' case against Lloyds Banking Group to the CPS, following a criminal investigation into a former HBOS banker that led to the liquidation of the TV presenter's Unique Group of businesses.

Dame Linda Dobbs is chairing an independent inquiry into the investigation and reporting of the fraud. This inquiry started in April 2017.

The HBOS Reading trial finished on 2 February 2017. In April 2017 Lloyds Banking Group (LBG) commissioned Professor Russell Griggs to oversee a compensation scheme for the victims of HBOS Reading. The scheme concluded all of the victims businesses would have failed despite the Reading fraud and therefore only awarded compensation for D&I (Distress and inconvenience) and nothing for D&C (Direct and consequential loss). In October 2018 SME Alliance (a not for profit organisation that supports and lobbies for victims of Bank misconduct) concluded the Griggs review was not fit for purpose and issued a complaint under the SM&CR to the FCA about the management of LBG in relation to the Griggs Review. SME Alliance also commissioned Jonathan Laidlaw QC to give an ‘Advice’ on the Griggs Review.

Laidlaw QC concluded the Griggs Review was “procedurally defective” and it referenced “LBG’s failure to adjust the scope of the Review following the public release of the Project Lord Turnbull Report is another important defect.” The Project Lord Turnbull Report was written by accountant Sally Masterton. She had worked for the bank from 1998, first under HBOS and then Lloyds. The report makes several serious allegations about HBOS and Lloyds management, the most important of which are that the Reading Fraud was deliberately concealed, and that the FSA was intentionally misled. Moreover, the report is highly critical of the auditors, KPMG. In section eight the report states, “KPMG have not only just been negligent but their direct involvement in a number of material malpractices and violations regarding HBOS is fundamental and exposes them to claims in relation to misconduct, serious dereliction of duty and breach of regulatory and statutory duties.” In 2013 Sally Masterton, a forensic accountant, provided information that was crucial to the police investigation into the Reading Fraud. Subsequently, Ms Masterton left the bank and brought a case for unfair constructive dismissal, which was settled in 2015.

In December 2018 Kevin Hollinrake MP, Co-chairman of the APPG on Fair Business Banking tabled a debate in Parliament on HBOS Reading and the Economic Secretary to the Treasury, John Glen MP, confirmed LBG would now fund an ‘Assurance’ review about the Griggs review, requested by the FCA.

This led to a report by Sir Ross Cranston, a retired High Court Judge, in December 2019. Sir Ross accused LBG of “an unacceptable denial of responsibility” over its treatment of the HBOS Reading victims. This resulted in questions from the FCA including: “We will also require LBG senior management to explain how and why the failings identified by Sir Ross occurred in the first place.”

Between December 2019 and February / March 2020, Antonio Horta-Osorio, the CEO of LBG, met with many of the Reading victims promising he would now oversee the compensation process personally. Many victims have complained there has been no contact with Mr. Horta-Osorio, who is now allegedly leaving the Bank for a post at Credit Suisse, since May 2020.

In April 2020 the Foskett Panel was formed under retired High Court Judge, Sir David Foskett, to finally compensate the victims of HBOS Reading. The process continues and the Panel have confirmed it could take up to a further two years (2023) to compensate all the victims.

In December 2020, the APPG on Fair Business Banking submitted a formal complaint under the SM&CR to the FCA about the conduct of LBG in relation to their treatment of HBOS Reading victims including the Bank's refusal to support victims or to compensate them for the additional three-year delay caused by the failed Griggs Review.

Three of the six criminals convicted for the HBOS Reading crimes have now been released from jail with a fourth due to be released by the end of 2021.

== Operations ==
HBOS conducted all its operations through three main businesses:

- Bank of Scotland plc
- HBOS Australia
- HBOS Insurance & Investment Group Limited

=== Bank of Scotland plc ===
Bank of Scotland plc was the banking division of the HBOS group, and operated the following brands:

==== United Kingdom ====
- Bank of Scotland
- Bank of Scotland Private Banking
- Bank of Scotland Treasury Services
- Bank of Scotland Business Banking
- Birmingham Midshires
- Halifax
- Capital Bank plc (Formally North west securities)
- AA Savings (the same brand also used Bank of Ireland for some accounts)
- Halifax Financial Services (Holdings) Ltd
- Halifax Investment Fund Managers Ltd
- Halifax Share Dealing Limited
- Halifax Unit Trust Management Ltd
- Intelligent Finance
- Sainsbury's Bank (50%) – holding sold to J Sainsbury plc on 31 January 2014.
- The Mortgage Business (TMB)
- Blair, Oliver & Scott (Debt recovery)
- St James's Place Bank

==== International ====
- Banco Halifax Hispania – rebranded as Lloyds Bank International in 2010 and sold to Banco Sabadell in 2013.
- Bank of Scotland Corporate
- Bank of Scotland International – transferred to Lloyds TSB Offshore in 2012, which became Lloyds Bank International in 2013.
- Bank of Scotland Investment Services
- Bank of Scotland (Ireland), trading as Halifax since 2006 and closed down on 31 December 2010.
- Bank of Scotland, Amsterdam branch - trading as Lloyds Bank since 2013 (savings) and 2014 (mortgages).
- Bank of Scotland, Berlin branch

=== HBOS Australia ===
HBOS Australia was formed in 2004 to consolidate the group's holdings in Australia. It consisted of the following subsidiaries:

- Capital Finance Australia
- BOS International Australia

On 8 October 2008, HBOS Australia sold its Bank of Western Australia and St Andrew's Australia Pty Ltd subsidiaries for approximately A$2bn to the Commonwealth Bank.

The group's businesses in Australia were sold to Westpac in October 2013.

=== HBOS Insurance and Investment Group Limited ===
HBOS Insurance & Investment Group Limited manages the group's insurance and investment brands in the UK and Europe. It consisted of the following:

- St James's Place Capital (60%)
- Halifax General Insurance Services Ltd
- St Andrew's Group
- Clerical Medical

It also used to own UK investment manager Insight Investment Management Limited. The Bank of New York Mellon acquired Insight in 2009.

== See also ==
- Museum on the Mound
