= Lloyds Bank International =

Subsidiary of Lloyds Bank

Lloyds Bank International Limited
- Type: Subsidiary
- Industry: Banking and financial services
- Founded: 2013 (1911)
- Headquarters: Saint Helier, Jersey, Channel Islands
- Products: Retail and Commercial banking
- Parent: Lloyds Bank
- Website: international.lloydsbank.com

Lloyds Bank International is a wholly owned subsidiary of Lloyds Bank Corporate Markets in the United Kingdom, which is in turn part of Lloyds Banking Group, one of the largest banking groups in Europe.

Lloyds Bank's overseas expansion began in 1911, and the Lloyds Bank International name, historically a major international commercial bank, is now used for the group's offshore banking interests.

== Present operations ==
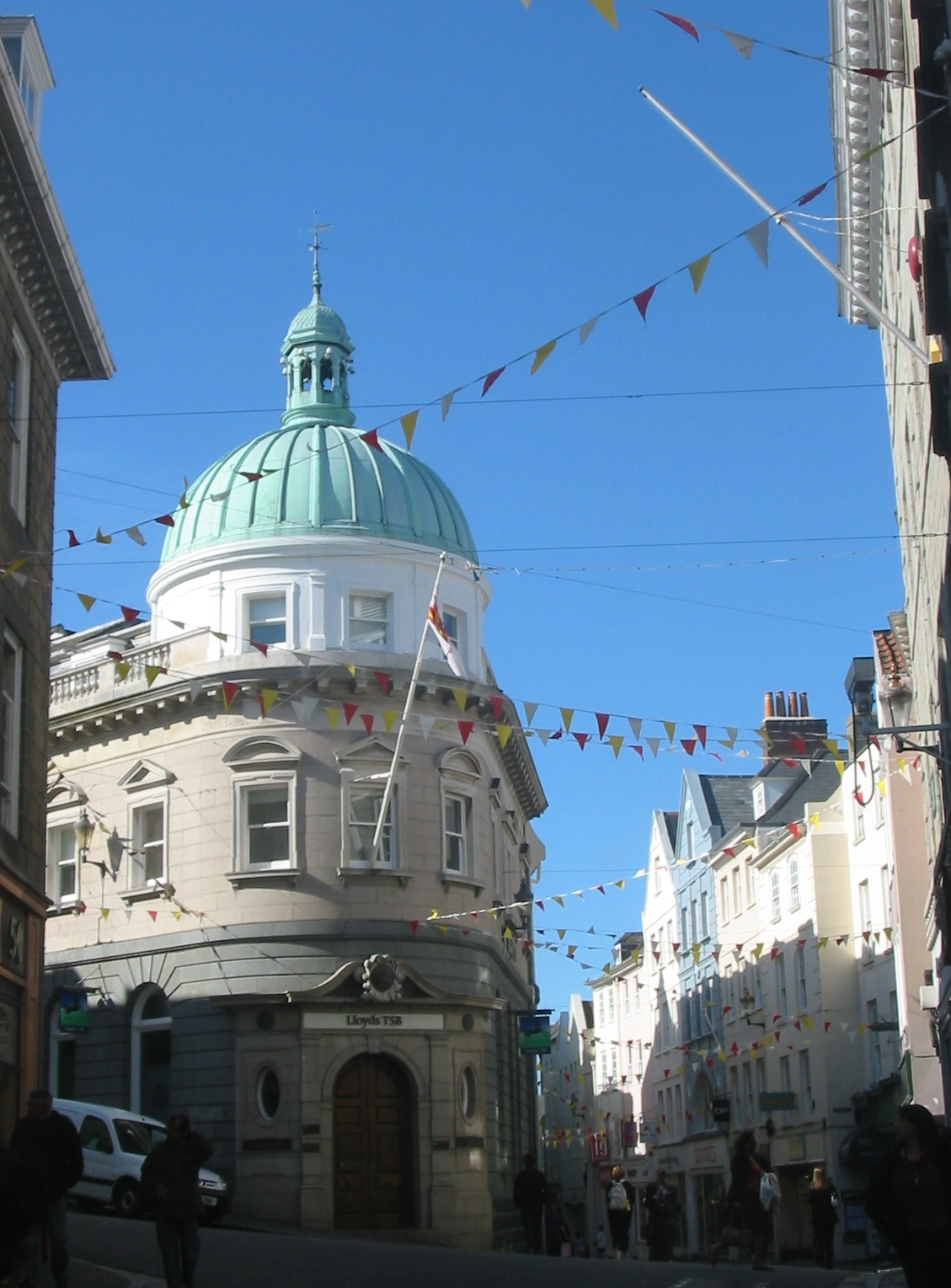
The Saint Peter Port branch, Guernsey, Channel Islands.

=== Lloyds TSB Offshore ===
Lloyds TSB Offshore was formed in Jersey in 2004, with branches in Guernsey and the Isle of Man. In 2013, Lloyds TSB Offshore was renamed Lloyds Bank International after incorporating the former Bank of Scotland International. Lloyds TSB Bank (Gibraltar), which was also known as Lloyds Bank International, changed its name to Lloyds Bank (Gibraltar) at the same time.

2014 saw the acquisition of Lloyds Banking Group's non-UK private banking operations in Monaco and Gibraltar by the Swiss Union Bancaire Privée⁣⁣.

In 2015, Lloyds Bank International employed over 1,000 people in the Channel Islands and Isle of Man.

=== Netherlands ===
In 2013, the Amsterdam branch of Bank of Scotland also transitioned to the Lloyds Bank name, while a Berlin branch continues to trade as Bank of Scotland. The branch offers personal mortgages and acquires private savings in the Netherlands over the internet and through intermediaries. Lloyds Bank has been separately active in the Dutch commercial banking market since 1966.

== Previous operations ==
The former Lloyds Bank International (LBI), both directly and through its banking subsidiaries, BOLSA and BOLAM, together with the National Bank of New Zealand, Lloyds Bank California and the colonial and foreign (later overseas) department of Lloyds Bank, was responsible for the international and foreign banking business of the Lloyds Bank group of companies from 1974 until a rationalisation of the business in 1986. At its inception, LBI employed 11,000 people of many nationalities; of this total, some 1,400 worked in the UK.

=== Europe ===
In 1911, Lloyds Bank (France) was formed when the bank acquired Armstrong and Co., based in Paris and Le Havre. From 1917, it was run jointly as Lloyds and National Provincial Foreign Bank. In 1955, the bank bought full ownership, and it became Lloyds Bank (Foreign). In 1964, with branches in London, Paris, Biarritz, Bordeaux, Le Havre, Lille, Nice, Roubaix, St Jean de Luz, Cannes, Brussels, Antwerp, Geneva, Zurich and Monte Carlo and flourishing with the development of the profitable Eurodollar market, Lloyds Bank (Foreign) was renamed Lloyds Bank Europe.

=== Banco Halifax Hispania ===
In 2010, following the takeover of HBOS by Lloyds TSB Group, Lloyds TSB Spain and Banco Halifax Hispania S.A.U. became Lloyds Bank International S.A.U. In 2014, Banco de Sabadell completed the acquisition of the Spanish operation and renamed it Sabadell Solbank.

=== Bank of London and South America ===
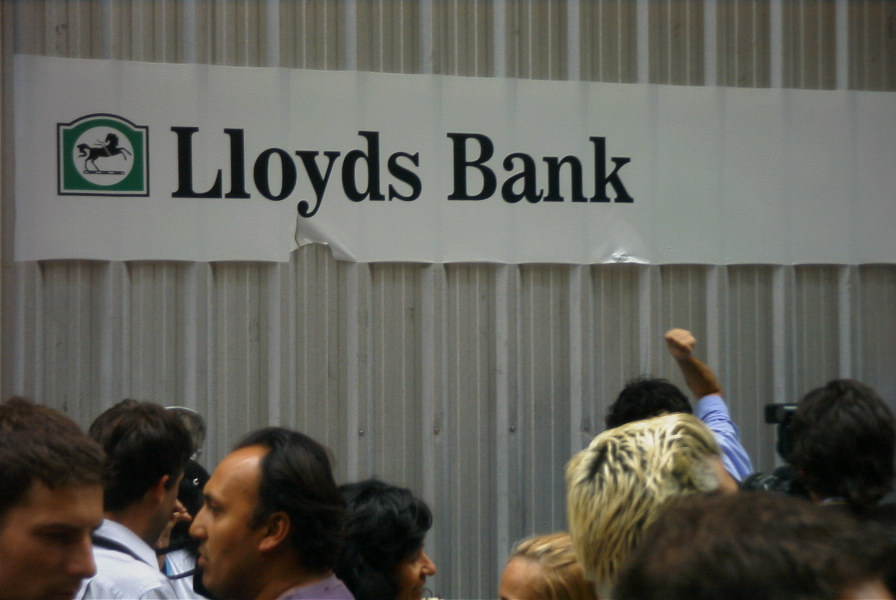
Demonstration against the Corralito, Buenos Aires, 2002.

A strong connection with Latin America began in 1918, with the acquisition of the London and River Plate Bank. In 1923, the merger of this bank with the London and Brazilian Bank resulted in the formation of the Bank of London and South America. Further expansion occurred in 1936, when BOLSA took over the Anglo-South American Bank.

The Bank of London and Montreal was a joint venture between the Bank of London and South America and the Bank of Montreal, established in 1958 and headquartered in the Bahamas.

In 1970, BOLSA acquired full control of BOLAM, and, in 1971, Lloyds Bank bought the controlling interest in BOLSA and merged it with Lloyds Bank Europe to form Lloyds and Bolsa International Bank, which became Lloyds Bank International in 1974, as it further strengthened its position in international markets.

In 1986, LBI's undertakings were vested in the parent Lloyds Bank by a local act of Parliament, the Lloyds Bank (Merger) Act 1985 (c. ix), as changes in international bank taxation arrangements meant its ongoing existence no longer offered any commercial advantage.

== Other operations ==
Although its foreign interests were focused on Western Europe and South America, by 1985, Lloyds Bank had offices in 45 countries worldwide.

=== National Bank of New Zealand ===
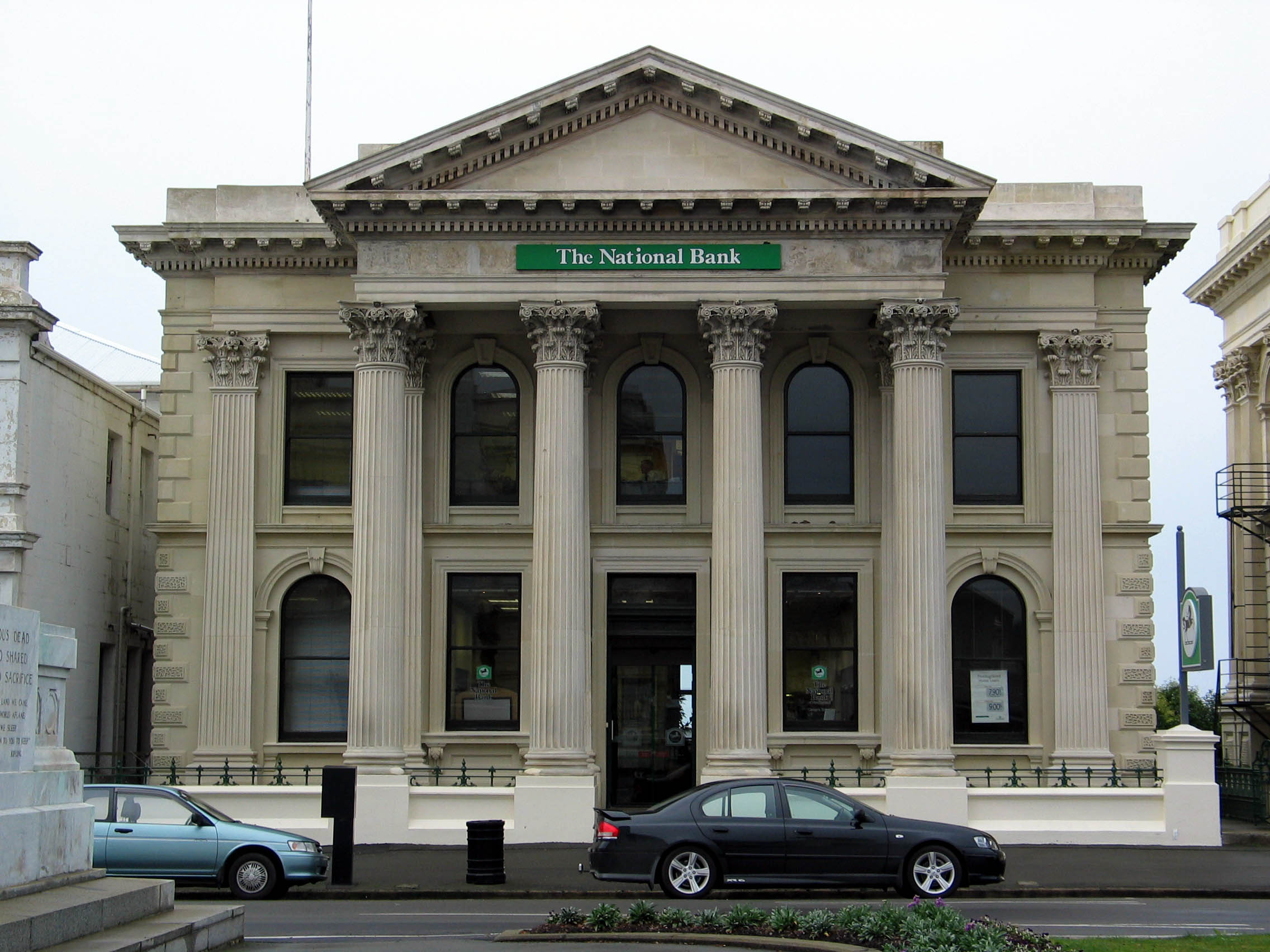
A branch of the National Bank of New Zealand in Lloyds' green livery.

In 1872, the National Bank of New Zealand was founded in London as an overseas bank and shared many directors with Lloyds Bank. In 1919, Lloyds Bank acquired a small interest in the National Bank and, in 1966, purchased it outright. In 1978, the National Bank moved its head office from London to Wellington.

The commanding presence of the National Bank was further strengthened in 1994 by the takeover of the former government-owned Rural Bank from Fletcher Challenge, making it the country's leading provider of agricultural finance. In 2003, Lloyds TSB sold the National Bank to the Australia and New Zealand Banking Group and in 2013, ANZ announced that the National Bank brand (including the black horse device and colour green) would be retired.

=== Middle and Far East ===
In 1961, Lloyds Bank transferred its eastern division (including Cox & Kings, British army agents) to National and Grindlays Bank in exchange for a 25 per cent share in National and Grindlays (renamed Grindlays Bank in 1975). The bank retained its interest in Grindlays until 1984, at which point it was sold to the ANZ Banking Group. In 2014, it was announced that Lloyds' Coxs and Kings branch would close by 2016.

=== North America ===
In 1974, Lloyds Bank acquired First Western Bank and Trust Company, renaming it Lloyds Bank California to reflect the change in ownership. Lloyds Bank California acquired First State Bank of Northern California in 1976, and, in 1986, its 88 branches and US$3 billion in assets were divested to Japanese-owned Golden State Sanwa Bank for $263 million in cash.

Lloyds Bank Canada was formed in 1986, when the bank purchased the Continental Bank of Canada. In 1990, after several years of losses, Lloyds Bank sold its Canadian operation to the Hongkong Bank of Canada, a subsidiary of HSBC Holdings.

== See also ==
- Lloyds and National Provincial Foreign Bank
