= Lloyds and National Provincial Foreign Bank =

- Company type: Joint venture
- Industry: Banking and financial services
- Predecessor: Lloyds Bank (France)
- Founded: 1917; 109 years ago
- Defunct: 1955; 71 years ago
- Successor: Lloyds Bank (Foreign)
- Headquarters: Paris, France
- Parent: Lloyds Bank and National Provincial Bank

Lloyds and National Provincial Foreign Bank Limited was a joint venture in France between London-based Lloyds Bank and National Provincial Bank, which existed from 1917 to 1955.

== History ==
Lloyds Bank (France) Limited was established in 1911, following the acquisition of Paris bankers, Armstrong & Co, the agent of various English banks. In 1917, National Provincial Bank of England acquired a 50 per cent shareholding in the French operation, which became Lloyds Bank (France) and National Provincial Bank (France) Limited until it was renamed Lloyds and National Provincial Foreign Bank Limited in 1919.

The bank's branches were run by locals during the occupation and the German administration exercised a considerable amount of control over policy after 1942. However, the Geneva branch remained under the control of London throughout the war and assisted the Allied war effort by the purchase of German, Italian and French notes for the British Legation to be used by British Secret Service.

=== Lloyds Bank Europe ===
The bank, which was not especially profitable, was always perceived as a Lloyds venture and attracted little reciprocal business for National Provincial at home. Consequently, National Provincial Bank sold its interest back to Lloyds Bank in 1955 and the subsidiary was renamed Lloyds Bank (Foreign) Limited, which became Lloyds Bank Europe Limited in 1964. Lloyds Bank Europe was merged with the Bank of London and South America in 1971, to form Lloyds Bank International and the former Lloyds Bank Europe business was renamed Lloyds Bank International (France) Limited. When Lloyds Bank International was wound down in 1986, it reverted to the original Lloyds Bank (France) name.

In 1989, the operations of the Paris branch and its banking subsidiary in Cannes, Lloyds Bank (France) S.A. (formerly Lloyds Bank (Cannes) S.A.) passed to Lloyds Bank S.A. and the following year the undertaking of the Monte Carlo branch passed to the parent Lloyds Bank Plc. Lloyds Bank (France) continued as a holding company under that name until 1991. The French wealth management business was divested to UBS AG in 2003 and merged into UBS (France) S.A. To reflect the change in ownership, the legal entity Lloyds Bank S.A. was renamed UBS Wealth Management (France) S.A.

== See also ==
- International Westminster Bank
- RBS International
