= Halifax (Ireland) =

Financial services company

Bank of Scotland (Ireland) Limited
- Company type: Subsidiary
- Industry: Financial services
- Founded: 1965 (as Equity Bank Limited)
- Defunct: 31 December 2010
- Fate: Ceased trading
- Headquarters: Dublin, Ireland
- Area served: Ireland
- Key people: Joe Higgins (CEO)
- Products: Various banking products aimed at the business and retail sector
- Number of employees: 750 (2010)
- Parent: Bank of Scotland plc

Bank of Scotland (Ireland) Limited was a wholly owned subsidiary of the Bank of Scotland, which later became part of Lloyds Banking Group. It offered commercial and corporate banking services under the Bank of Scotland brand and retail banking services under the Halifax brand. From 10 February 2010 the bank no longer accepted new business and it ceased to operate as a licensed bank on 31 December 2010. The assets of the bank were merged into Bank of Scotland plc.

== History ==
The company was founded in 1965 as Equity Bank Limited. In 1999, it was purchased by the Governor and Company of the Bank of Scotland. Later, the parent company established its own brand in the Irish market through the direct sales of mortgages from Edinburgh. Following this, it was decided to rebrand the existing Irish operation as Bank of Scotland (Ireland) in 2000.

In 2001, the bank purchased ICC Bank plc from the Irish State. This company, originally established as the Industrial Credit Company, and later known as Industrial Credit Corporation plc, was set up in 1933 by Seán Lemass in the Irish Free State to encourage investment in industry. The company was modelled on the Agricultural Credit Corporation (later renamed ACC Loan Management, also defunct).

In 2004, the company took over the direct mortgage sales business from its parent company, and moved it to Dublin. Major new offices were also opened in a brand new building in Limerick, named "Bank of Scotland House" (formerly the site of the Carlton Cinema).

In 2005, the company announced that it was taking over the Electricity Supply Board's ShopElectric chain of retail outlets, and turn them into a network of branches. This made the company the fourth-largest bank in Ireland, with 46 branches. The company detailed its retail banking plans on 10 January 2006, the first three branches opened the following day, as well as a call centre in Dundalk, County Louth. This put it in direct competition with Permanent TSB as well as National Irish Bank, the smallest of the traditional Big Four. The banks became the first Irish bank to open on Saturday as standard.

Following the merger of Halifax and Bank of Scotland to form HBOS, in August 2006, the bank announced that it would adopt a two-brand strategy, re-branding as Halifax for its retail business and retaining the Bank of Scotland name for its commercial customers.

In 2007, Halifax announced the launch a personal current account paying 10% interest on credit balances up to €2000 to customers lodging €1500 or more per month. The bank further announced that it was the first in Ireland to offer a Visa Debit card rather than the Laser debit card issued by other Irish banks back then, which had restricted usability outside Ireland.

== Closure ==
On 9 February 2010 Bank of Scotland announced that it would be shutting all of its 44 retail branches in the Republic in addition to its customer service centre in Dundalk and direct support functions with a loss of 750 jobs. Halifax cited the economic crisis at the time as the main reason for this decision. The Bank, in its online press release, stated that the commercial and corporate strands of the business in Ireland would remain unaffected. Bank of Scotland (Ireland) chief executive, Joe Higgins, said : "We have arrived at this difficult position only after an extensive and exhaustive review of all options to secure a viable future for the bank overall and for these businesses."

However, in August 2010, it was announced that the remaining business of Bank of Scotland Ireland was to be wound down by the end of the year. This followed losses of 1.88 billion euro in the first six months of the year, due mainly to impaired loans to property developers.

== See also ==
- Bank of Scotland International
- Sabadell Solbank
- List of banks in the Republic of Ireland
