= Continental Bank Leasing Corp v Canada =

- Supreme Court of Canada

Hearing: January 26, 1998 Judgment: September 3, 1998
- Full case name: Continental Bank Leasing Corporation v Her Majesty the Queen
- Citations: [1998] 2 SCR 298
- Docket No.: 25532

Holding
- A partnership does not dissolve by section 34 of the Partnership Act simply because a bank, contrary to the Income Tax Act section 174, unlawfully owns or invests in one of the partners.

Court membership
- Chief Justice: Antonio Lamer; Puisne Justices: Claire L'Heureux-Dubé, John Sopinka, Charles Gonthier, Peter Cory, Beverley McLachlin, Frank Iacobucci, John C. Major, Michel Bastarache

Reasons given
- Majority: McLachlin J. (para. 103) joined by L'Heureux-Dubé, Gonthier, Cory, Iacobucci, and Major JJ.
- Dissent: Bastarache J.

Continental Bank Leasing Corp. v Canada, [1998] 2 SCR 298 is a partnership law and tax law decision of the Supreme Court of Canada where the Court validated a partnership arrangement which ran contrary to the Bank Act. A separate hearing, Continental Bank of Canada v Canada [1998] 2 SCR 358, dealt with the related transactions that followed the creation of the partnership.

== Background ==
Continental Bank, a banking corporation, decided to wrap up its operations in December 1986 by selling its assets and those of its subsidiaries. The buyer, Central Leasing Corp, agreed to purchase most of the leases in one of Continental Bank's fully owned subsidiaries, Continental Bank Leasing Co. Because the assets were depreciable, and Leasing Co would have to pay recaptured Capital Cost Allowance (CCA) on the leases upon selling them, the buyer proposed a partnership arrangement wherein Leasing Co could retain its deductible CCA.

In the series of transactions, which occurred over a period of five days during the Christmas holidays, Leasing Co entered into a partnership with some of the buyer's subsidiaries. Leasing Co then transferred the leases to the partnership, using a rollover under section 97(2) of Canada's Income Tax Act, in exchange for a 99% interest in the partnership. Then, Leasing Co transferred its share in the partnership to its parent corporation, Continental Bank, in a tax-free transfer under section 88(1) of the Income Tax Act. At this point, the buyer's subsidiaries held a 1% share, and Continental Bank a 99% share, in a partnership which owned the leases. Continental Bank then sold its share in the partnership to the buyer. As a result, Leasing Co was able to avoid paying its recovered CCA, and the buyer now effectively owned the leases with unchanged tax attributes.

== Analysis ==
=== Definition of "Partnership" ===
Justice Bastarache outlines the details of the transactions and discusses the elements of the definition of a "partnership" in section 2 of the Partnership Act. Bastarache J ultimately dissents on the later issue of Continental Bank's contravention of the Banking Act, but the court unanimously agrees that the initial partnership between Continental Bank Leasing Co and the subsidiaries of Central Leasing Co was valid.

In determining that the partnership was valid, the court examines the three essential elements of partnerships in Canada: a partnership is a business, it is carried on in common, and it is carried on with a view to profit. On the first, Bastarache J passes the partnership because it is a trade, occupation, or profession as per section 1(1)(a) of the Partnership Act. The partnership is also deemed to carry on business in common because, as long as management and duties are outlined in the partnership agreement, there are no requirements about the length of a partnership relationship, or that the partnership need expand its business in that time. That is, it sufficed that the partnership carried on a nominal level of business over the Christmas holidays. Last, the court concluded that the pursuit of profit need only be an ancillary purpose to the creation of the partnership.

=== Dissolution of Partnership for Illegality ===
The second major issue for the court was the validity of the partnership in light of section 174 of the Banking Act, which prohibits banks from entering into partnership relationships. Because section 34 of the Partnership Act invalidates partnerships where partners are carrying on business illegally, the Minister of National Revenue argued that neither Continental Bank nor its subsidiary could be a partner. On this issue, the majority decision (written by McLachlin CJ) and the dissent (Bastarache J) differed. The majority concluded that this did not affect the validity of the partnership because Continental Bank Leasing was a distinct entity from the bank, and the bank was only an investor in the partnership without directly participating.

== Dissent ==
Bastarache J differs on the issue of the validity of the partnership under section 34 of the Partnership Act. Because Continental Bank Leasing Co had received a tax benefit by violating a provision of the Banking Act, Bastarche J determined that the partnership was invalid for reasons of public policy.

== See also ==
- List of Supreme Court of Canada cases (McLachlin Court)
