= Lloyds Bank Corporate Markets =

Subsidiary of Lloyds Banking Group

Lloyds Bank Corporate Markets plc
- Type: Subsidiary
- Industry: Investment Banking
- Founded: 28 September 2016; 10 years ago
- Headquarters: London, England, UK
- Operating income: ▲GB£984 million (2024)
- Net income: ▲GB£501 million (2024)
- Parent: Lloyds Banking Group

Lloyds Bank Corporate Markets plc is the investment banking arm of Lloyds Banking Group. It has two primary investment banking functions: Capital Markets, under which Debt Capital Markets, private side derivatives and Securitised Products sit and Financial Markets, the interest rates, currency, commodities, inflation and gilts, flow sales and trading business.

Lloyds Bank Corporate Markets was incorporated on 28 September 2016. It was created to comply with the Financial Services (Banking Reform) Act 2013. The Act implements the Independent Commission on Banking recommendation that essential banking services are separated from investment banking activities by 2019.

== Operations ==
The non ring-fenced entity also incorporates the business undertaken by Lloyds Bank International and the Group's branches in the United States, Singapore and the Crown Dependencies.

The company was authorised with restrictions in 2017 and is currently registered as a Credit Institution with the Financial Conduct Authority and Prudential Regulatory Authority. Until the restrictions are removed, it is limited in its ability to undertake or have migrated to it any regulated financial services activities. In 2018, it was reported that traders will be physically separated from their colleagues and placed in a "glass box" to comply with rules.

Fitch Ratings has assigned Lloyds Bank Corporate Markets and Lloyds Bank International expected Long-Term Issuer Default Ratings of 'A(EXP)'.

== See also ==
- Lloyds Associated Banking Company
- Lloyds Bank International
- Hill Samuel
