= Bank of Scotland International =

Division of Bank of Scotland (2003–2011)

- Company type: Subsidiary undertaking
- Industry: Financial services
- Predecessor: Bank of Scotland Offshore; Halifax International
- Founded: 2003; 23 years ago
- Defunct: 2011; 15 years ago
- Successor: Lloyds TSB International
- Headquarters: St Helier, Jersey
- Parent: HBOS

Bank of Scotland International Limited was the international banking division of Bank of Scotland. Established in 2003, it was headquartered in Jersey, and operated branches on the Isle of Man and Hong Kong, until merging with Lloyds TSB Offshore in 2011 as Lloyds TSB International brand.

The bank offered offshore banking facilities, with Pound sterling, US dollar and euro denominated accounts.

== History ==
In 1997, Halifax Building Society demutualised and, in 2001, it merged with the Bank of Scotland to form HBOS. In 2003, Bank of Scotland Offshore Limited, which had been incorporated in the Isle of Man in 1998, was merged with Halifax International Limited, which had been incorporated in Jersey in 1990.

In 2011, following the acquisition of HBOS by Lloyds TSB Group (subsequently renamed Lloyds Banking Group), customer accounts were migrated to Lloyds TSB Offshore, which became Lloyds Bank International in 2013.

== Other operations ==
In 1975, Bank of Scotland opened its first overseas office in Houston, Texas. Branches followed in other U.S. states, Moscow, Hong Kong and Singapore. Inroads were subsequently made into Australasia, with the 1987 purchase of Countrywide Bank in New Zealand (sold to the National Bank of New Zealand in 1998) and that of the Bank of Western Australia in 1995 (sold to the Commonwealth Bank in 2008).

Bank of Scotland (Ireland) Limited was formed in 2000; it was re-branded as Halifax in 2006 and, in 2010, the Irish operation was wound-down. In 2013, the Dutch branch of Bank of Scotland, which had been established in 1999, transitioned to the Lloyds Bank brand, while a German branch, established in 2008, continues to trade as Bank of Scotland.

== See also ==
- Halifax (Ireland)
- Sabadell Solbank
