= Banco Sabadell =

Spanish banking group

Banco de Sabadell, S.A.

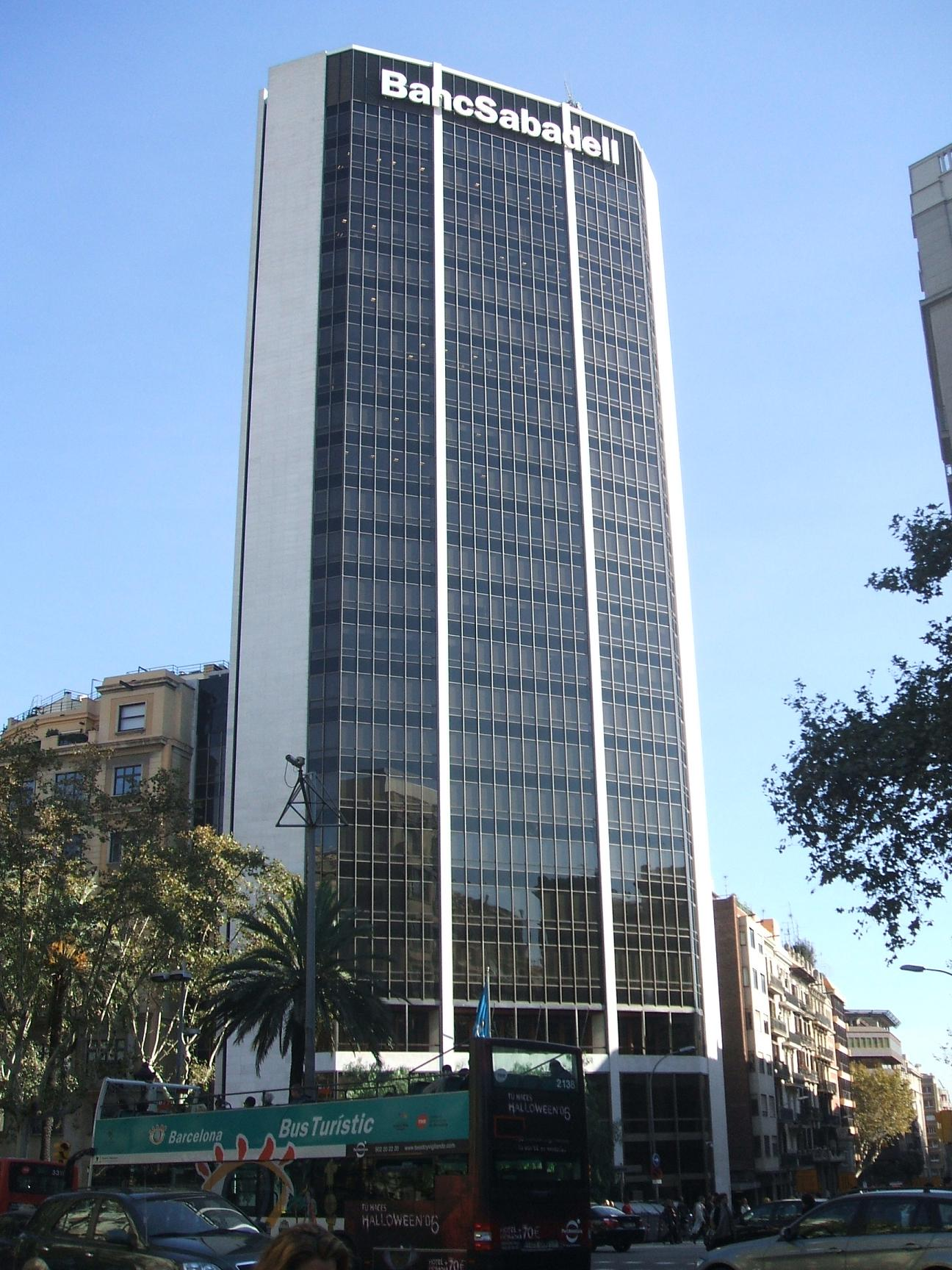
- Headquarters in Barcelona, Spain
- Type: Public
- Traded as: BMAD: SAB
- ISIN: ES0113860A34
- Industry: Financial services
- Founded: 31 December 1881; 144 years ago, in Sabadell, Spain
- Headquarters: Sabadell, Catalonia, Spain
- Key people: Josep Oliu Creus (chairman); César González-Bueno Mayer (CEO)
- Products: Financial services
- Revenue: 35,165,000,000 (2022)
- Net income: ▲€213 million (2022 1Q)
- Total assets: ▲€253.256 billion (2022 1Q)
- Number of employees: ▼18,985 (2022 1Q)
- Website: www.grupbancsabadell.com

Banco de Sabadell, S.A. (Catalan: Banc Sabadell) is a Spanish multinational financial services company headquartered in Sabadell, Catalonia. It is the 4th-largest Spanish banking group. It includes several banks, brands, subsidiaries and associated banks. It is a universal bank and specialises in serving small and medium enterprises (SMEs) and the affluent with a bias towards international trade.

As of March 2022, the total assets of Banco Sabadell Group amounted to €253,256 billion. It has a network of 1,594 branches, 18,985 employees and 12.1 million customers.

It has been listed on the Bolsa de Madrid since 2001, and is part of the IBEX 35.

Banco Sabadell has been designated as a Significant Institution since the entry into force of European Banking Supervision in late 2014, and as a consequence is directly supervised by the European Central Bank.

== Strategic plan ==
In February 2014, Banco Sabadell started its 2014–2016 business plan, Triple, that aims to leverage its new size and margin-generating capability. The main goal of the 2014–2016 Triple Plan is profitability. Key themes of the new plan are transformation (transformation of the business, transformation of the production process and transformation of the balance sheet) and internationalization (laying the foundations for becoming more international in terms of structure and resources and entering new markets).

== History ==
At the end of the 19th century, the city of Sabadell was known as a bustling "factory city" with approximately 18,000 residents, 4,000 of whom were employed in the wool industry. Together with the nearby city of Terrassa, Sabadell accounted for 66% of Spain's wool production. Mechanization processes, introduced from 1875 onwards, led to significant productivity increases—doubling output in some steam-powered factories. This newfound efficiency enabled local industrialists to accumulate capital, leading some to begin informally lending money among themselves.

Over time, these industrialists specialized in financial operations, but no institution offered the long-term credit necessary for purchasing raw materials, such as wool imported from Argentina or Australia. This unmet need spurred the idea of creating a bank tailored to the needs of local manufacturers. The goal was to establish an institution that could facilitate payments at the local level, provide short-term credit, and support investments in international raw materials.

Although Sabadell already had a savings institution (Caixa d'Estalvis de Sabadell), founded in 1859, it focused exclusively on promoting small-scale savings and could not handle the complex financial operations required by industrialists.

On December 31, 1881, a group of 127 entrepreneurs and merchants from Sabadell, led by the Gremi de Fabricants de Sabadell (Manufacturers' Guild), founded Banco Sabadell. Its purpose was to finance local industry and supply raw materials—such as wool and coal—on more favorable terms. The bank's initial share capital was set at 10 million pesetas, contributed by 127 shareholders, the majority from Sabadell, with a handful from Barcelona and one from Barberà del Vallès.

The bank's first office was located in the ground floor of the guild's building. In addition to traditional banking, Banco Sabadell initially engaged in other business activities, including buying and selling raw materials, importing machinery, and establishing electrical installations. This phase lasted until 1907, when the bank decided to divest its non-banking activities and focus solely on commercial banking operations.

=== Mid-20th century: growth and modernization ===
In 1953, Banco Sabadell's shareholders signed a syndication agreement to ensure the bank's independence, limiting individual shareholdings to 0.7% of the total capital. This move protected the institution from potential takeovers. A year later, in 1954, the bank opened its first purpose-built branch in Plaça de Sant Roc in Sabadell, strategically located between the city hall and the former Ateneu Sabadellenc. The branch's iconic building was designed by renowned architect Lluís Bonet i Garí.

During the 1960s, Banco Sabadell began expanding its presence to nearby towns. Its first branch outside Sabadell opened in Sant Cugat del Vallès in 1965, followed shortly by branches in Cerdanyola del Vallès, Ripollet, and Castellar del Vallès. By 1970, the bank had established itself in Barcelona, marking a significant step in its territorial expansion.

=== National and international expansion ===
In 1977, Banco Sabadell opened its first branch outside Catalonia and began its expansion to the rest of the communities in Spain, starting in Madrid, followed by its first international branch in London in 1978, strategically located in the heart of the City of London. By 1987, the bank had expanded further internationally, opening a branch in Paris.

Banco Sabadell became a pioneer in Spain's banking sector by embracing technological innovation. In 1986, it launched Fonobanc, a telephone banking service, followed in 1988 by Infobanc, a computer-based banking platform. These initiatives set the stage for the introduction of BancSabadellNet in 1998, Spain's first online banking service.

In 2023, Banco Sabadell consolidated its digital operations under a new subsidiary, Sabadell Digital. This subsidiary was tasked with overseeing app development, software innovation, and cybersecurity, marking a major step in the bank's commitment to digital transformation.

=== Stock market debut and strategic acquisitions ===
Banco Sabadell underwent significant changes starting in 1996. Under the leadership of Josep Oliu i Creus, who became chairman in 1999, the bank began an aggressive expansion strategy. It entered the IBEX 35 in 2004, shortly after its initial public offering in 2001.

Throughout the 2000s and 2010s, Banco Sabadell acquired numerous institutions, including NatWest España (1996), Banco Atlántico (2004), and Banco Urquijo (2006). Notably, it acquired Caja de Ahorros del Mediterráneo (CAM) in 2012 for the symbolic price of one euro, integrating its network into the Sabadell group.

These acquisitions allowed Banco Sabadell to extend its reach internationally, particularly in the United States and Mexico. In 2015, the bank acquired TSB Banking Group in the UK, further solidifying its position in global markets.

=== Challenges and resilience ===
The political turmoil in Catalonia during the 2017 independence referendum led Banco Sabadell to relocate its corporate headquarters to Alicante (in Valencia, another autonomous communitie of Spain on October 5, 2017, citing the need to ensure the stability of deposits and customer confidence. The move was facilitated by a Spanish government decree allowing expedited relocations. Despite this, the bank faced criticism and deposit withdrawals from some quarters. In 2025 they decide to return to the original city in Sabadell Catalonia

Banco Sabadell was not immune to the financial impacts of the COVID-19 pandemic. Its stock price dropped significantly but recovered strongly in subsequent years. By November 2023, its stock had risen to €1.30 per share, making it one of the fastest-recovering companies on the IBEX 35.

In 2024, Banco Sabadell rejected a hostile takeover bid from BBVA, reaffirming its independence and strategic direction.

=== Legacy and current status ===
Banco Sabadell remains a key player in Spain's banking sector and has continued its growth and strategic focus into 2023. The bank manages assets valued at approximately €235 billion, marking a 6.4% decrease year-over-year due to repayments on TLTRO III loans. It employs over 21,000 people globally and operates through around 1,600 branches, emphasizing digital transformation and cost efficiency.

In 2023, customer funds reached €201 billion, with €56.6 billion allocated to savings and investment products in Spain. The bank's liquidity remains robust, with a Loan-to-Deposit ratio of 94% and a Liquidity Coverage Ratio (LCR) of 228%. Additionally, the non-performing asset (NPA) ratio improved, demonstrating solid risk management practices. The fully loaded CET1 capital ratio rose to 13.21%, reflecting a strengthened financial position.

=== Attempted BBVA Takeover ===
In April 2024, Spanish Bank BBVA made an offer to acquire Sabadell which turned into a hostile takeover attempt in May. The takeover attempt was opposed by Sabadell's management, Spain's government and unions. BBVA received approval from the European Central Bank and Spain's competition regulator, but the government ruled the two banks couldn't legally merge for at least three years after any acquisition.

In September 2025, BBVA raised its offer to €17 billion and changed the offer to an all-stock deal to mitigate against shareholders that may have large capital gains. Sabadell's CEO criticized the offer as "very weak, and worse than the first one".

In October 2026, BPCE bought a 7% stake in Banco Sabadell.

=== Timeline ===
- 1881: Founded in Sabadell, province of Barcelona, on 31 December 1881.
- 1965: Territorial expansion.
- 1978: London, first branch of the international network.
- 1986: Remote banking.
- 1987: International branch in Paris.
- 1988: Created Sabadell Banca Privada.
- 1996: Acquired Banco NatWest España: Solbank project.
- 2000: Acquired Banco Herrero.
- 2001: Floated on the stock market.
- 2002–2004: Introduced multi-brand strategy.
- 2004: Acquired Banco Atlántico.
- 2004: Included in IBEX 35.
- 2006: Acquired Banco Urquijo.
- 2007: Acquired TransAtlantic Bank, Miami.
- 2008: Zurich, new Bancassurance partner.
- 2009: Acquired Mellon United National Bank (Miami).
- 2010: Founded Sabadell United Bank.
- 2010: Acquired Banco Guipuzcoano.
- 2010: New plan CREA 2010–2013.
- 2011: Launched SabadellGuipuzcoano brand.
- 2011: Acquired Lydian Private Bank (Miami).
- 2011: Selected as winning bidder for Caja de Ahorros del Mediterráneo (CAM).
- 2012: Acquired Caja de Ahorros del Mediterráneo (CAM).
- 2012: Banco Sabadell Urquijo BP creation.
- 2013: Acquired Banco Gallego and Lloyds Banking Group's retail and private banking business and the local investment management business in Spain, Lloyds Bank International. Lloyds is selling its loss-making Spanish operations for a 1.8% stake in Sabadell, worth about €84 million, plus an additional sum of up to €20 million over the next five years.
- 2014: Acquired JGB Bank (Miami).
- 2014: Banco Sabadell starts independent operation in Mexico.
- 2014: Triple announced.
- 2015: Acquired TSB, a retail bank based in the United Kingdom.
- 2025: Proposed sale of TSB to Santander, subject to shareholder and regulator approval.

== Brands ==
- SabadellAtlántico: The group's primary brand in the Spanish market. It operates throughout Spain except in SabadellGuipuzcoano and Banco Herrero territories. It focuses on commercial banking for individuals and companies.
- SabadellGuipuzcoano: Formerly Banco Guipuzcoano. It is the group's brand in Navarre, La Rioja and the Basque Country. It focuses on commercial and corporate banking.
- Banco Herrero: The bank's only brand in Asturias and León. following the acquisition of Banco Herrero. It focuses on commercial banking for individuals and companies. It is the top banking network in Asturias and one of the leading networks in León.
- Sabadell Solbank: It focuses on commercial Banking for Europeans living in Spanish tourist areas. Branches in Mediterranean coastal areas and Spanish Islands. Lloyds Bank International was its trading name, owned by Banco Sabadell. The bank was established as Banco Halifax in 1993, as the Spanish subsidiary of Halifax. Banco Halifax became part of Lloyds Banking Group in 2009 and was renamed Lloyds Bank International. Lloyds Banking Group sold it in April 2013. The Lloyds Bank name was used under temporary licence. The bank was renamed Sabadell Solbank in November 2013, and was fully integrated into Sabadell on 15 March 2014.
- ActivoBank: It focuses on clients operating exclusively electronically (internet and telephone).
- SabadellUrquijo: Private banking unit, a merger of Sabadell Banca Privada and Banco Urquijo. Branches in main economic and wealth hotspots.
- SabadellGallego: It is the group's reference brand in Galicia, following the acquisition of Banco Gallego. It focuses on commercial and corporate banking.
- SabadellCAM: It is the group's reference brand in the Valencian Community and Murcia, following the Banco CAM acquisition. It focuses on commercial banking.

== Subsidiaries ==
- Banco Sabadell de Andorra: It is an entity established in the Principality of Andorra. Banco Sabadell has an ownership of 50.97% of the bank's capital. It focuses on affluent individuals and to the main companies in the Principality of Andorra.
- BanSabadell Fincom: It focuses on consumer finance. 100% owned by Banco Sabadell.
- Dexia Sabadell: Subsidiary specialising in funding local government. Banco Sabadell (30%) and Dexia Group (70%).
- Sabadell United Bank: Commercial banking brand in the United States. Resulted from the acquisition of Mellon United National Bank in south Florida (15 January 2010) and the integration of TransAtlantic Bank (9 August 2010), acquired in 2007, Lydian Private Bank (2011) and JGB Bank (2014). SUB branches were sold off to Iberiabank in the fall of 2017.
- Solvia: It focuses on real estate. It has concentrated its servicing capabilities.
- TSB Bank: Retail bank based in the United Kingdom. Acquired by Banco Sabadell in July 2015.

== Branch network ==
At the end of the year 2014, Banco Sabadell operated through 2,310 branches and had 17,529 employees.

Banco Sabadell 53 international branches and representative offices in Algiers, Peking, Caracas, Dubai, Istanbul, Mexico City, New York, New Delhi, Santo Domingo, São Paulo, Shanghai, Singapore and Warsaw.

Banco Sabadell has subsidiaries and associated Banks in Andorra, United States, Portugal, United Kingdom; and branches in London, Miami, Paris, Hendaye and Casablanca.

== Board of directors ==
The members of the Board of Directors of Banco Sabadell are:

Position	Name
Chairman	Josep Oliu Creus
Deputy Chairmen	Javier Echenique Landiribar
Managing director	Jaime Guardiola Romojaro
Director	Héctor María Colonques Moreno
Director	Joaquín Folch-Rusiñol Corachán
Director	Mª Teresa García-Milà Lloveras
Director	Joan Llonch Andreu
Director	David Martínez Guzmán
Director	Aurora Catá Sala *
Director	José Manuel Martínez Martínez
Director	José Ramón Martínez Sufrategui
Director	António Vitor Martins Monteiro
Director	José Luis Negro Rodríguez
Director	José Permanyer Cunillera
Secretary to the Board	Miquel Roca i Junyent
Deputy Secretary	María José García Beato

* To be ratified at the next shareholders' meeting

== Shareholder structure ==
By tranches (n. % of equity)		Other information	
Up to 120,000 shares	37%	Number of shares	4,024,460,614
More than 120,000 shares	63%	Number of shareholders	231,481

== See also ==
- List of banks in the euro area
- List of banks in Spain
