= Halifax (bank) =

British bank

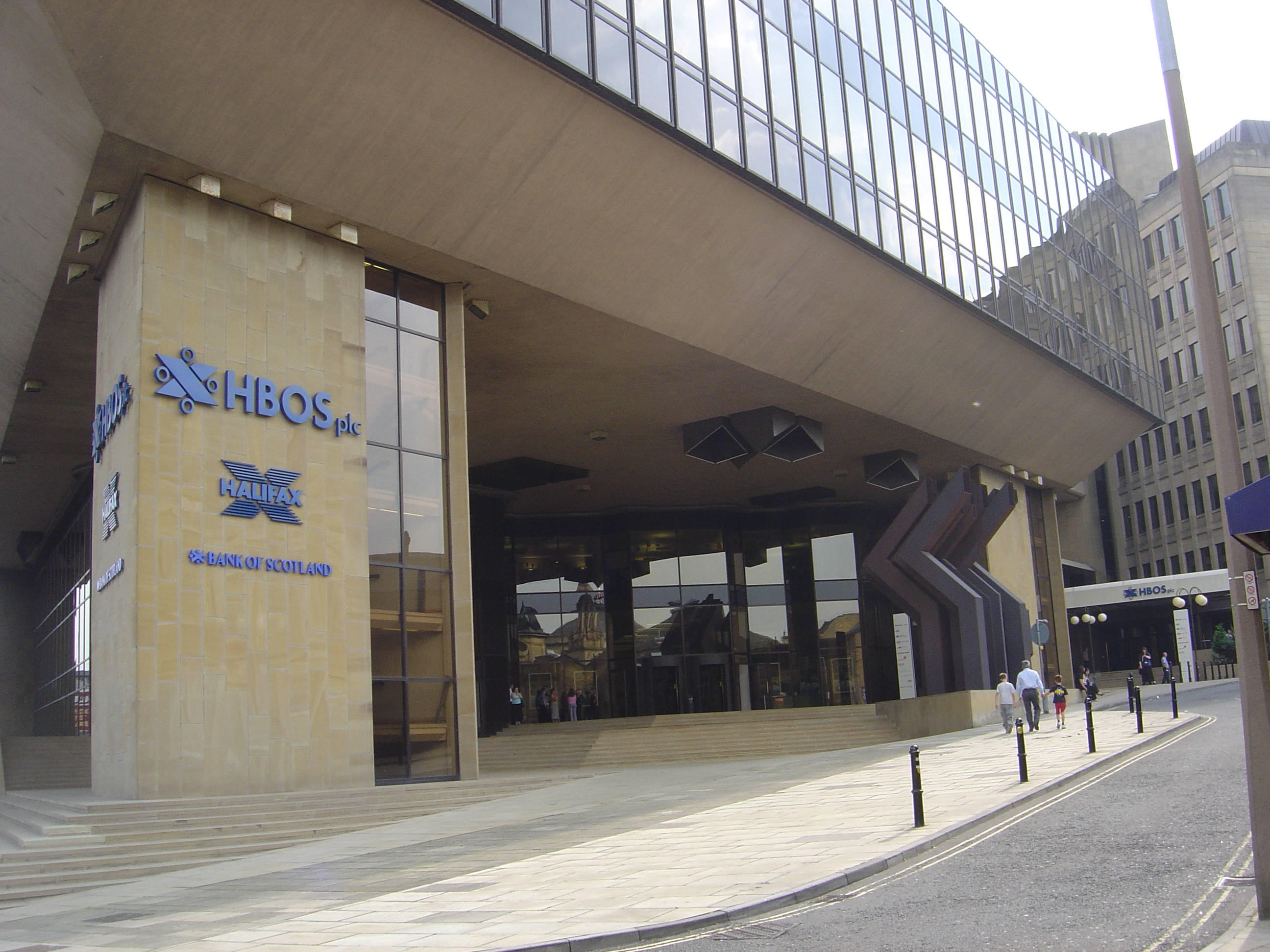
- The Halifax Trinity Road Headquarters, 2005
- Trade name: Halifax
- Type: Division
- Industry: Finance and insurance
- Founded: 1853
- Fate: Merged into Lloyds
- Successor: Lloyds
- Headquarters: Halifax, West Yorkshire, England, UK
- Area served: United Kingdom
- Key people: Russell Galley retired May 2023 (managing director)
- Products: Financial services
- Owner: Bank of Scotland
- Parent: Lloyds Banking Group
- Website: halifax.co.uk

Halifax (previously known as Halifax Building Society and colloquially known as The Halifax) is a British banking brand operating as a trading division of Bank of Scotland, itself a wholly owned subsidiary of Lloyds Banking Group.

It is named after the town of Halifax, West Yorkshire, where it was founded as a building society in 1853. By 1913 it had developed into the UK's largest building society. It continued to grow and prosper, and maintained this position within the UK until 1997, when it demutualised.

In 1996, it became Halifax plc, a public limited company which was a constituent of the FTSE 100 Index. In 2001, Halifax plc merged with the Bank of Scotland, forming HBOS. In 2006, the HBOS Group Reorganisation Act 2006 legally transferred the assets and liabilities of the Halifax chain to the Bank of Scotland. That bank, originally established by an act of Parliament, the Bank of Scotland Act 1695 (c. 88 (S)), became a standard plc, with Halifax becoming a division of Bank of Scotland. A takeover of HBOS by Lloyds TSB was approved by the Court of Session on 12 January 2009, and on 19 January 2009, Bank of Scotland, including Halifax, formally became part of Lloyds Banking Group.

In July 2026, it was announced that the Halifax brand would be phased out, with rebranding as Lloyds Bank. The bank closed to new customers on 1 July 2026; the website and app closed in November.

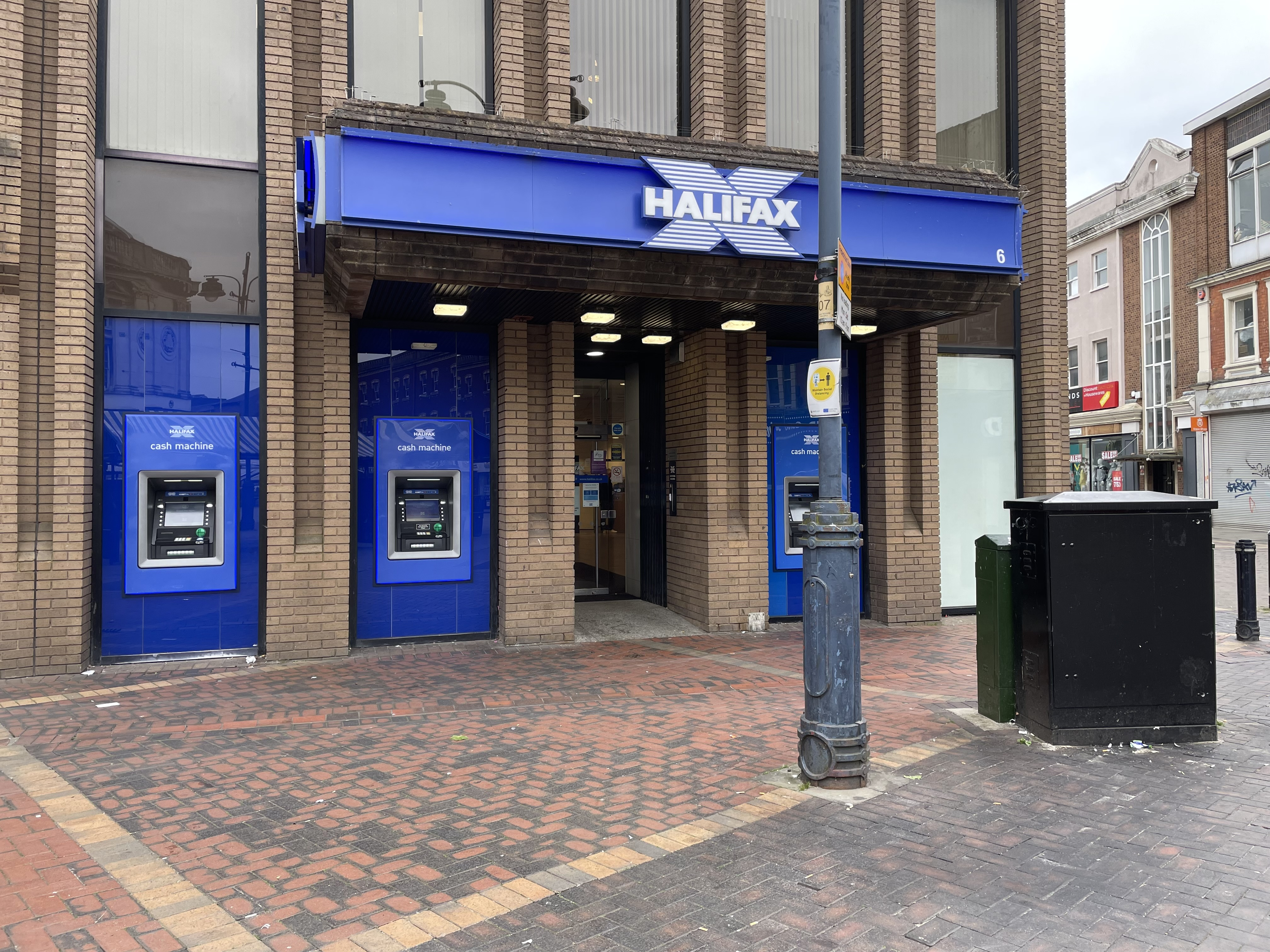
The exterior of the Walsall Halifax branch in 2024

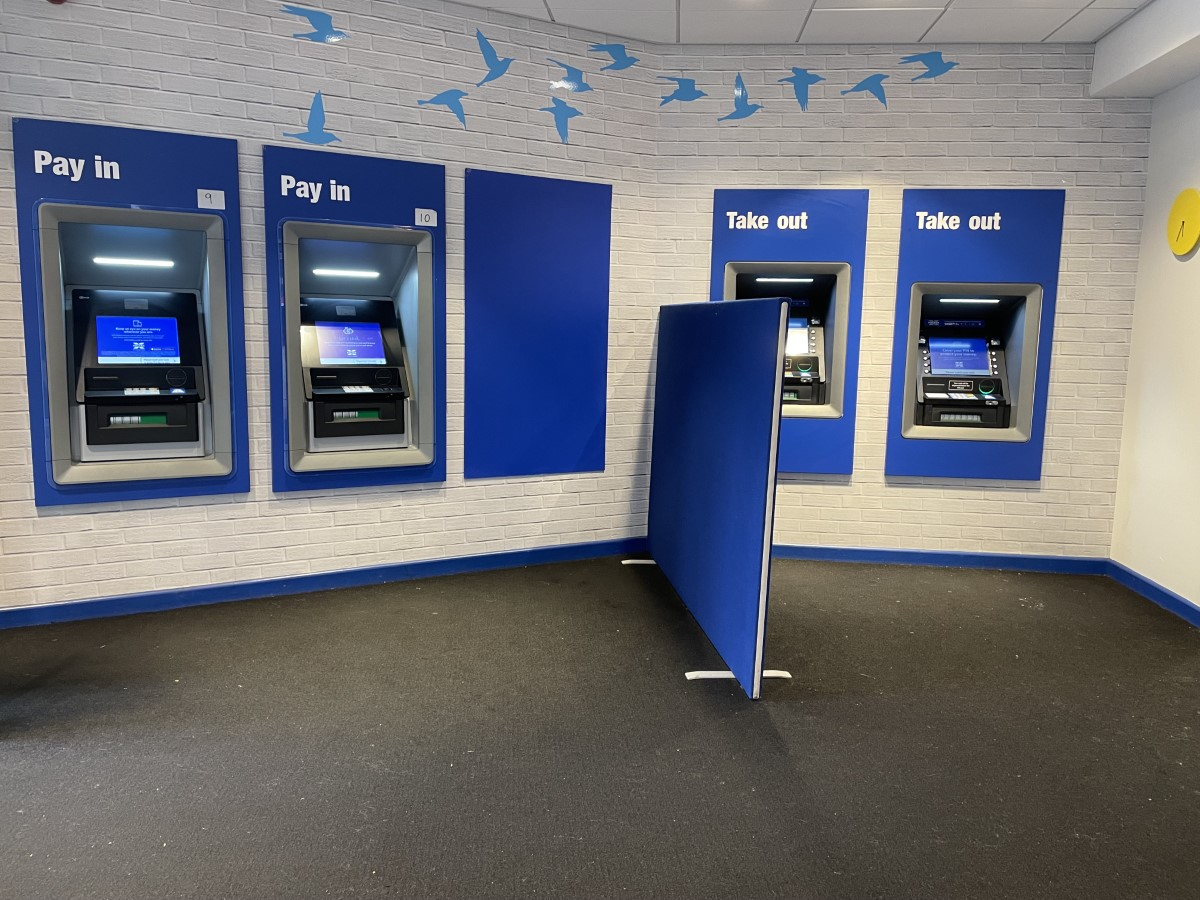
Cash Machine area of the Walsall Halifax branch in 2025

== History ==
=== The Jonas Tylor era ===
The Halifax was formed out of the Loyal Georgian Society, a friendly society which carried out lending. Its decision to withdraw from lending led directly to the formation of the building society. The Halifax Permanent Building and Investment Society was proposed by the town's leaders at a meeting in December 1852. Its rules were ratified in February 1853 and it was registered under the Benefit Building Societies Act 1836, with the "Investment" omitted from its title. Jonas Tylor, a 24-year-old lawyer's clerk, was appointed Secretary and he was supported as president by John Fisher, manager of the Halifax Joint Stock Banking Company. Jonas Tylor was to serve as Secretary of the Halifax for almost fifty years and he was responsible for the society's strategy of branch expansion from its beginning. Three branches were opened in its first year and by 1862 there was a total of 12 branches, all within Halifax. The first move out of Halifax came in 1862 with the formation of a branch in Huddersfield, which had its own chairman and directors.

One of the features of the Halifax was its willingness to finance the philanthropic housing development by prominent local businessmen. Edward Akroyd, a local mill owner, financed the building of working-class houses "built cheaply, perhaps without taste" through his Goahead Building Club. His subsequent plan to build a "superior class of dwellings" involved the formation of a Building Association and it was this development of the Akroydon model housing scheme in the 1860s that was financed by the Halifax. There followed a more substantial scheme with John Crossley, a carpet manufacturer, creating The West Hill Park Model Dwellings.

The 1903 history dutifully recorded the branch expansion in the late decades of the nineteenth century. By 1871 another ten local offices had been opened, supported by the construction of a new head office in 1873. Another 22 were opened in the next decade including the important cities of Bradford and Leeds; the Halifax had developed a significant regional presence. By 1902 there were 11 principal branches, all in Yorkshire cities, with a further 49 smaller branches.

=== The Enoch Hill era ===
After the death of Jonas Tylor, the appointment of his successor brought in [Sir] Enoch Hill, destined to be one of the great names in building society history. Hill was a mill worker's son becoming a "half timer" in a Leek silk mill aged 8, with little of the required afternoon education forthcoming. He was full time at the age of 13, later moving from mill work to farming, printer's apprentice and then becoming a local jobbing printer. His work with the church was recognised by the elders and he benefitted from their personal tuition. Amongst other activities he helped the blind secretary of Leek United Permanent Benefit Building Society by reading to him. Hill became increasingly involved with the administration of the Leek and that became his main work from 1896. It was from the position of Secretary to the Leek that he was recruited by the Halifax in 1903, at the age of 37.

One of Hill's early decisions was to concentrate on owner occupiers, particularly the cheaper properties. In 1904/5 the Halifax claimed to have opened more new accounts than any incorporated building society in the UK; in 1908 it had the largest advances and by 1913 it was the largest building society by size of assets. Despite its size, by the end of WWI the Halifax was still largely based in Yorkshire and Lancashire and the next stage was to take the Society national. The first branch in the south was opened at Shaftesbury in 1919; the all-important London office followed in 1924. Between 1918 and 1928 around 100 new branches and agencies were opened, doubling the Halifax's coverage; that decade finished with new offices in Glasgow and Edinburgh.

By 1928 Halifax was in the unique position of having the two largest building societies in the country and they decided to merge. The Halifax Equitable Building Society had been formed in 1871 and it too grew rapidly. By 1911 it claimed to be the 11th largest; third by 1921 and second by 1924. At the time of the merger the Halifax Permanent had assets of £33m and the Equitable £14m. One of the features of the Equitable was that it had formed its own bank in 1900—the Halifax Equitable Bank. Although independent from the building society, only society members could buy shares. The Equitable Bank was sold to the Bank of Liverpool and Martins on the grounds that banking was best left to specialists. The Halifax Permanent Building Society paralleled the Equitable by forming its own bank in 1910—the Halifax and District Permanent Banking Company—but that was sold in 1917. Following the merger, branches were quickly opened in a number of leading cities: Aberdeen, Birmingham and Cardiff in 1929; and Belfast, Derby and Newcastle in 1930. On the back of the expansion in branches and agencies, and helped by the boom in private housing, assets increased from £47m after the 1928 merger to £123m in 1938. That was the year in which Sir Enoch Hill retired, at the age of 72, having been in charge of the Halifax for 35 years. He had been Chairman of the National Association of Building Societies from 1921 to 1933; the first secretary of the International Congress of Building Societies in 1914 and was knighted in 1928.

=== New head office ===
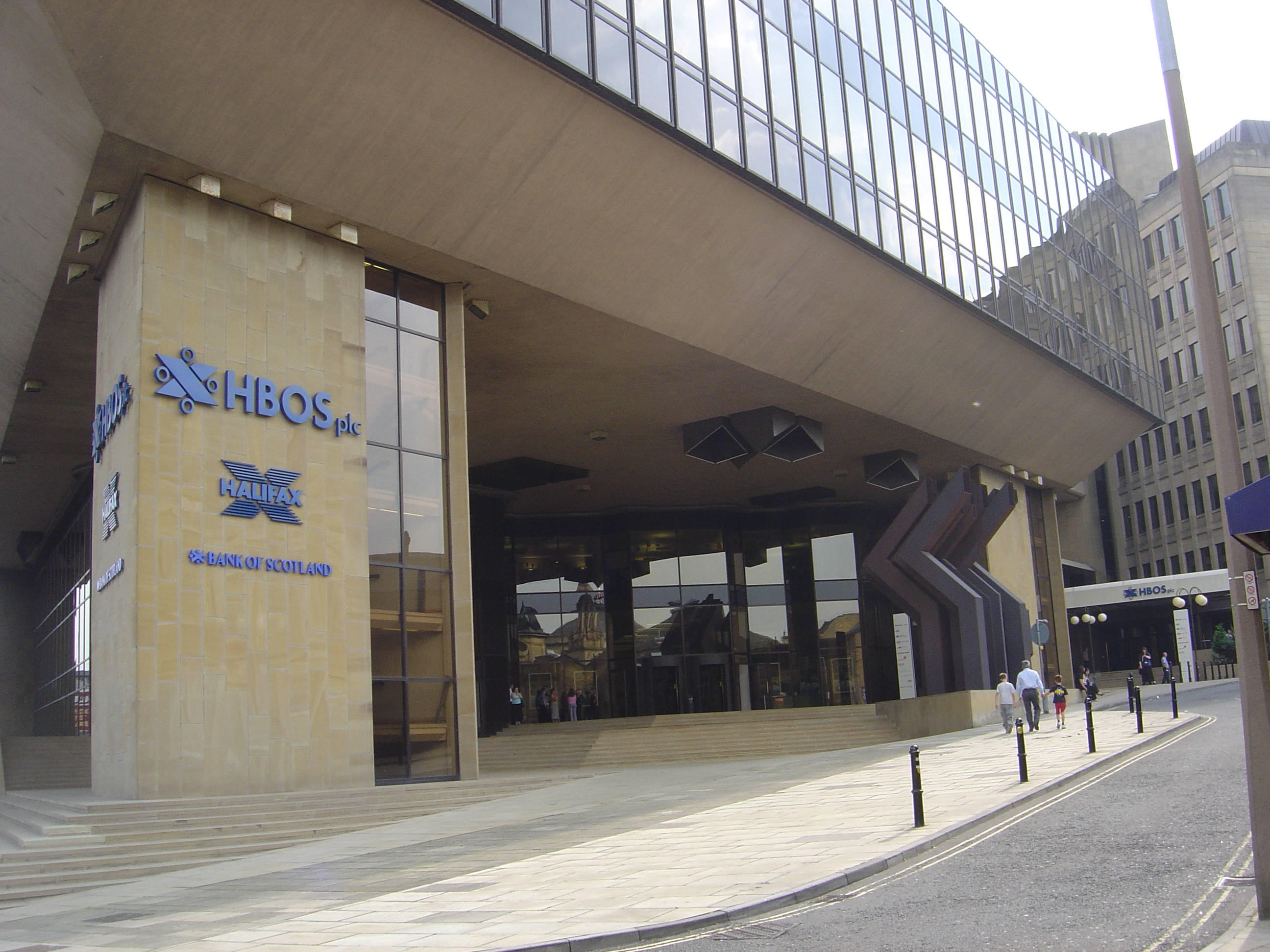
The former headquarters of the Halifax in Trinity Road, Halifax, West Yorkshire

A new head office was built at Trinity Road, Halifax, in 1973. The distinctive diamond-shaped building was used on marketing material during the 1980s and 1990s. Underneath the building is a specially constructed deedstore which is used to store property deeds.

=== Demutualisation ===
The deregulation of the financial services industry in the 1980s saw the passing of the Building Societies Act 1986 which allowed societies greater financial freedoms, and diversification into other markets. Accordingly, the Halifax acquired an estate agent to complement its mortgage business. It also expanded by offering current accounts and credit cards, traditionally services offered by commercial banks. In 1993, it established a Spanish subsidiary, Banco Halifax Hispania, mainly serving British expatriate mortgage customers.

The 1986 act also allowed building societies to demutualise and become public limited companies instead of mutually owned organisations, owned by the customers who borrowed and saved with the society. Although the Abbey National demutualised in 1989, the process was not repeated until the late 1990s, when most of the large societies announced demutualisation plans. In 1995, the Halifax announced it was to merge with the Leeds Permanent Building Society and convert to a plc. The Halifax floated on the London Stock Exchange on 2 June 1997. Over 7.5 million customers of the Society became shareholders of the new bank, the largest extension of shareholders in UK history.

A high-street branch of the Halifax in Peterborough

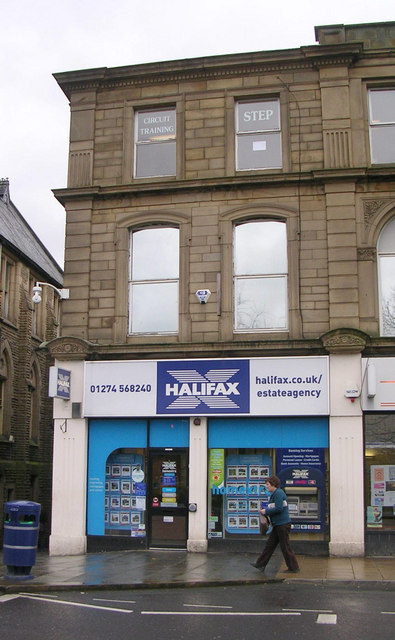
A branch of Halifax Estate Agency in Bingley

As Halifax plc, the new bank was the fifth largest in the UK in terms of market capitalisation. Further expansion took place with the 1996 acquisition of Clerical Medical Fund Managers, a UK life insurance company. In 1999, the Halifax acquired the Birmingham Midshires Building Society and ComparetheLoan. In 2000, Halifax established Intelligent Finance, a telephone-and-internet-based bank.

=== Formation of HBOS ===
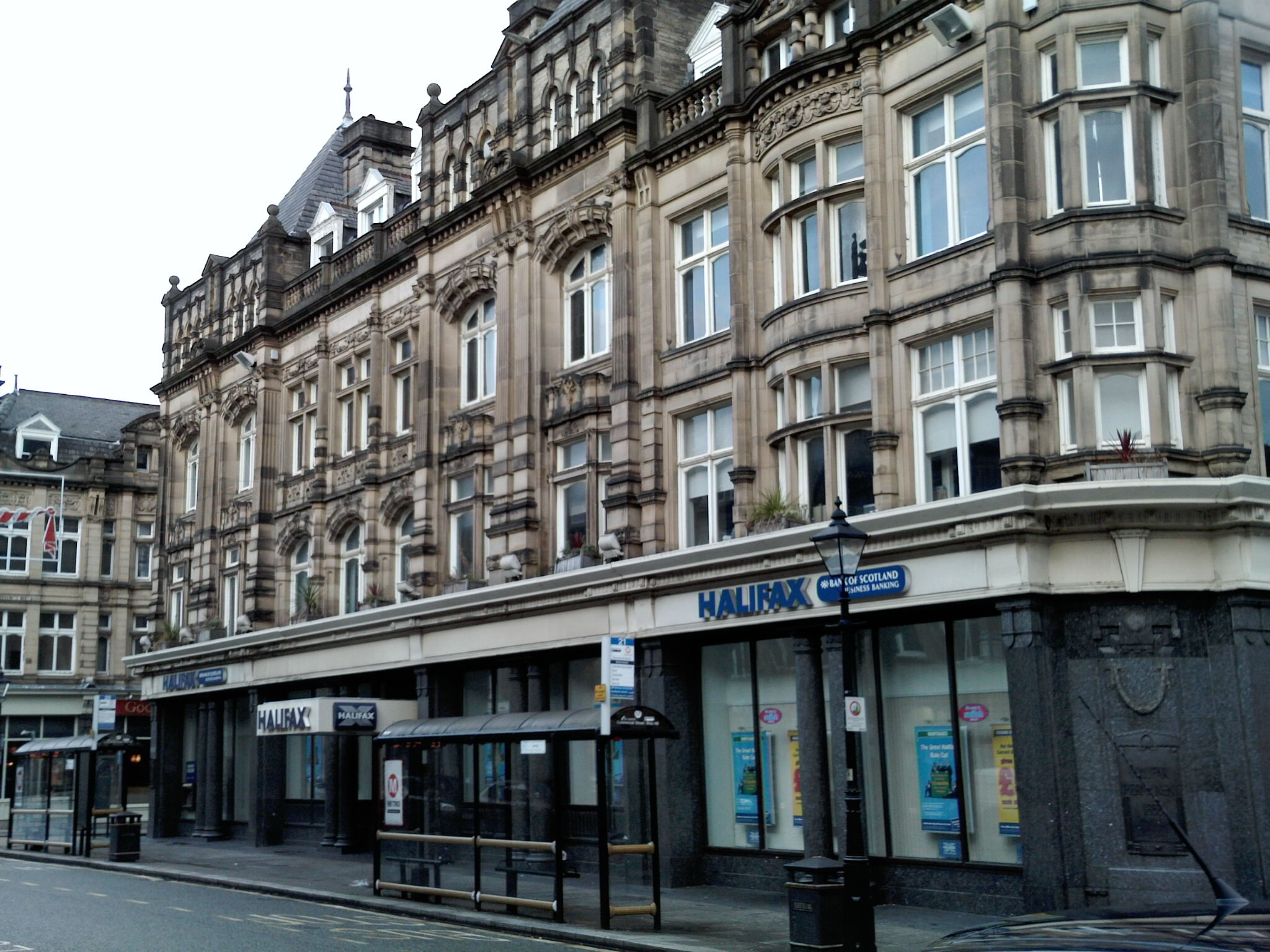
The main branch of Halifax, in Halifax (now closed by Lloyds Banking Group as part of its branch closure project)

In 2001, a wave of consolidation in the UK banking market led Halifax to agree a £10.8 billion merger with the Bank of Scotland. The new group was named Halifax Bank of Scotland (HBOS) with headquarters in Edinburgh, and retained both Halifax and the Bank of Scotland as brand names. Halifax branches in the rest of the UK use the Bank of Scotland brand for business banking. In 2006 the Bank of Scotland (Ireland), HBOS's main retail bank in Ireland, announced that it would be rebranding its retail business as Halifax, citing the Irish public's exposure to Halifax advertising on ITV as among the reasons.

In 2006, the HBOS Group Reorganisation Act 2006 was passed. The aim of the act was to simplify the corporate structure of HBOS. The act was fully implemented on 17 September 2007 and the assets and liabilities of Halifax plc transferred to Bank of Scotland plc. The Halifax brand name was to be retained as a trading name, but it no longer exists as a legal entity.

=== Lloyds Banking Group ===
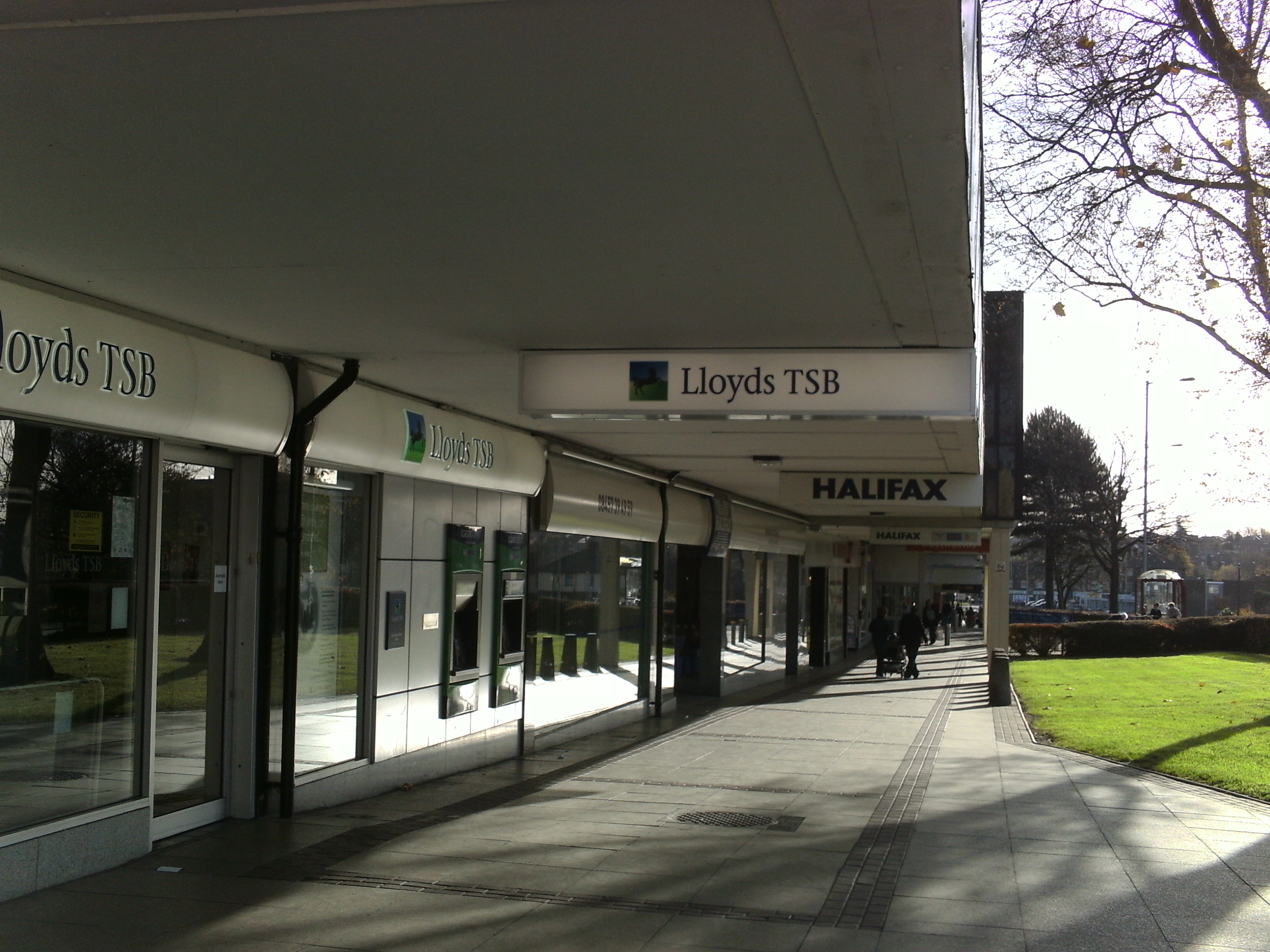
Neighbouring Halifax and Lloyds TSB branches outside the Arndale Centre, Cross Gates, Leeds

HBOS was acquired by the Lloyds Banking Group in January 2009 amid falling share price and speculation as to its future. Bank of Scotland plc (including its brands such as Halifax) became a wholly owned subsidiary of the group.

In February 2009, Halifax made significant changes to its current accounts. From then, all new standard current accounts had zero credit and debit interest, along with no paid and unpaid item charges (which were previously up to £35). Halifax has replaced their basic 'Easycash' account with the 'Basic Account'. They have no unpaid charges and replaced all Visa Electron cards with Visa Debit cards. They also align themselves with all other Halifax current accounts with an increased ATM daily withdrawal limit of £500. Instead, all overdraft-eligible Halifax 'Standard current account' customers pay £1 per day for being overdrawn by up to £1999.99 within an arranged overdraft, and £2 per day for up to £2999.99 and £3 per day for over £3000.00. For unarranged overdrafts the fee is £5 per day. Credit interest has been replaced by a £5 net payment every month if customers abide by the terms of the 'Reward current account'. These changes were implemented to all current account customers (except student accounts) from December 2009. These changes caused a great deal of media attention at the time of the change, with Martin Lewis and consumer magazine Which? urging Halifax customers to keep their accounts in credit wherever possible, or consider moving their accounts to an alternative bank, in response to the new charges.

On 16 October 2009, Halifax Estate Agency was sold to LSL Properties for a fee of £1. The branches were renamed as one of LSL's existing brands, Reeds Rains.

On 14 November 2009, HBOS was hit by a power failure which affected all branches, cash machines and online banking. The bank said that the power failure occurred at an IT centre in Copley, West Yorkshire which caused several problems for Halifax's banking system. Halifax's online banking system did not recover from the power failure for several hours.

On 1 July 2026, Lloyds Banking Group announced that it would phase out the Halifax brand and closed the bank to new customers. All existing accounts will move to Lloyds branding over time, and branches are set to lose the Halifax name from early 2027.

== Advertising ==
Halifax have created adverts that have featured pop culture from franchises such as The Flintstones, Top Cat, Scooby-Doo, the 1939 musical fantasy, The Wizard of Oz, and Thunderbirds.

In February 2021, Halifax released a TV advertisement featuring the Oasis song "Stand By Me".

== See also ==
- Sabadell Solbank
- Halifax (Ireland)
- Bank of Scotland International
