= Continental Bank of Canada =

Chartered bank in Canada

- Company type: Bank
- Industry: Financial services
- Founded: 1980-1986, 2013
- Headquarters: Toronto, Ontario

The Continental Bank of Canada was a chartered bank in Canada founded in 1977 that existed until 1996. In 2013, investors not related to that bank attempted to establish a new bank under that name, but the project did not succeed.

== First Continental Bank ==
The first Continental Bank had its origins in 1925 when the Industrial Acceptance Corporation was founded. It became IAC, a financing company, in 1970. Continental Bank of Canada was chartered in 1977 when IAC decided to expand the scope of operations, and began business in June 1979. It had its head office at 130 Adelaide St. West, Toronto. In 1981, it was Canada's ninth-largest bank with 70 branches across the country, and assets at June 30 of $1.6 billion. Also in that year, Continental Bank absorbed its parent company, IAC.

In 1985, after a loss of depositor confidence and a run on deposits that affected several small banks, the bank received a line of Credit from the Bank of Canada. The bank and its remaining 55 branches were then acquired by Lloyds Bank Plc of the United Kingdom and became "Lloyds Bank Canada" in 1986. Continental Bank continued to exist as a chartered bank until 1996 because of a dispute with Revenue Canada. Lloyds Bank sold its Canadian operations to HongKong Bank of Canada in 1990, which became HSBC Bank Canada.

== Second Continental Bank ==
In 2011, Eric Sprott (a businessman and investor), and two companies that he controlled (Sprott Inc., Sprott Continental Holdings Ltd. (SCHL)), agreed with Canadian Currency Exchange Canada Inc. (CCEC) to create a new bank named "Continental Bank of Canada" (CBOC) as a wholly owned subsidiary of SCHL. Continental Currency Exchange operates foreign exchange services through its 19 branches across Ontario.

In 2013, the new bank was chartered.

Under the proposed transaction, Sprott, and his companies, SCHL and Sprott Inc., worked with CCEC and its owners, Scott Penfound and his family members, towards establishment of CBOC as a new Schedule 1 licensed bank. Under the proposed transaction contemplated that (i) CBOC would be set up as a bank, wholly owned by SCHL, (ii) CBOC would purchase the shares of CCEC in exchange for shares to be issued by CBOC equal to 49% of the capital stock of CBOC; and (iii) the business and branch network of CCEC would become the genesis of the new bank.

On January 12, 2015, Mr. Sprott advised the Board of Directors of CBOC that he would not continue to fund the business transaction. The Office of the Superintendent of Financial Institutions issued an order dated January 13, 2015 that CBOC should not carry on any business of banking or accept any deposits. That order remained in place until CBOC ceased to be a bank on December 16, 2019.

== See also ==
- List of banks in Canada
