= Birmingham Midshires =

Division of the Bank of Scotland

- Trade name: Birmingham Midshires
- Company type: Division
- Industry: Finance and insurance
- Predecessor: Birmingham and Bridgewater Building Society; Midshires Building Society
- Founded: 30 June 1986; 39 years ago
- Headquarters: Wolverhampton, England, UK
- Products: Financial services
- Parent: Lloyds Banking Group
- Website: www.birminghammidshires.co.uk

Birmingham Midshires Building Society was a British building society which was headquartered at Pendeford Business Park, Wolverhampton.

== History ==
The Birmingham Midshires was formed on 30 June 1986 by the merger of the Birmingham and Bridgwater and the Midshires Building Societies. (Birmingham and Bridgwater was formed by way of an earlier merger in 1982; Midshires had its origins in the Redditch Land and Building Society which was formed in 1860).

In 1998, the Birmingham Midshires Building Society agreed to a takeover bid from the Royal Bank of Scotland. However the deal collapsed when Halifax plc tabled a more lucrative offer.

On 15 September 2005 Birmingham Midshires announced it was planning to close 48 of its 67 branches, through a phased programme concluding in March 2006, and the conversion of the remaining outlets to the Halifax brand.

As of July 2025, all Birmingham Midshires savings accounts have been closed, and its website replaced with a short information page. The brand remains in use for buy to let mortgages on a separate website.
