= Anglo-South American Bank =

Liquidated British and Argentine bank

Coordinates: 34°36′24.3″S 58°22′20.5″W

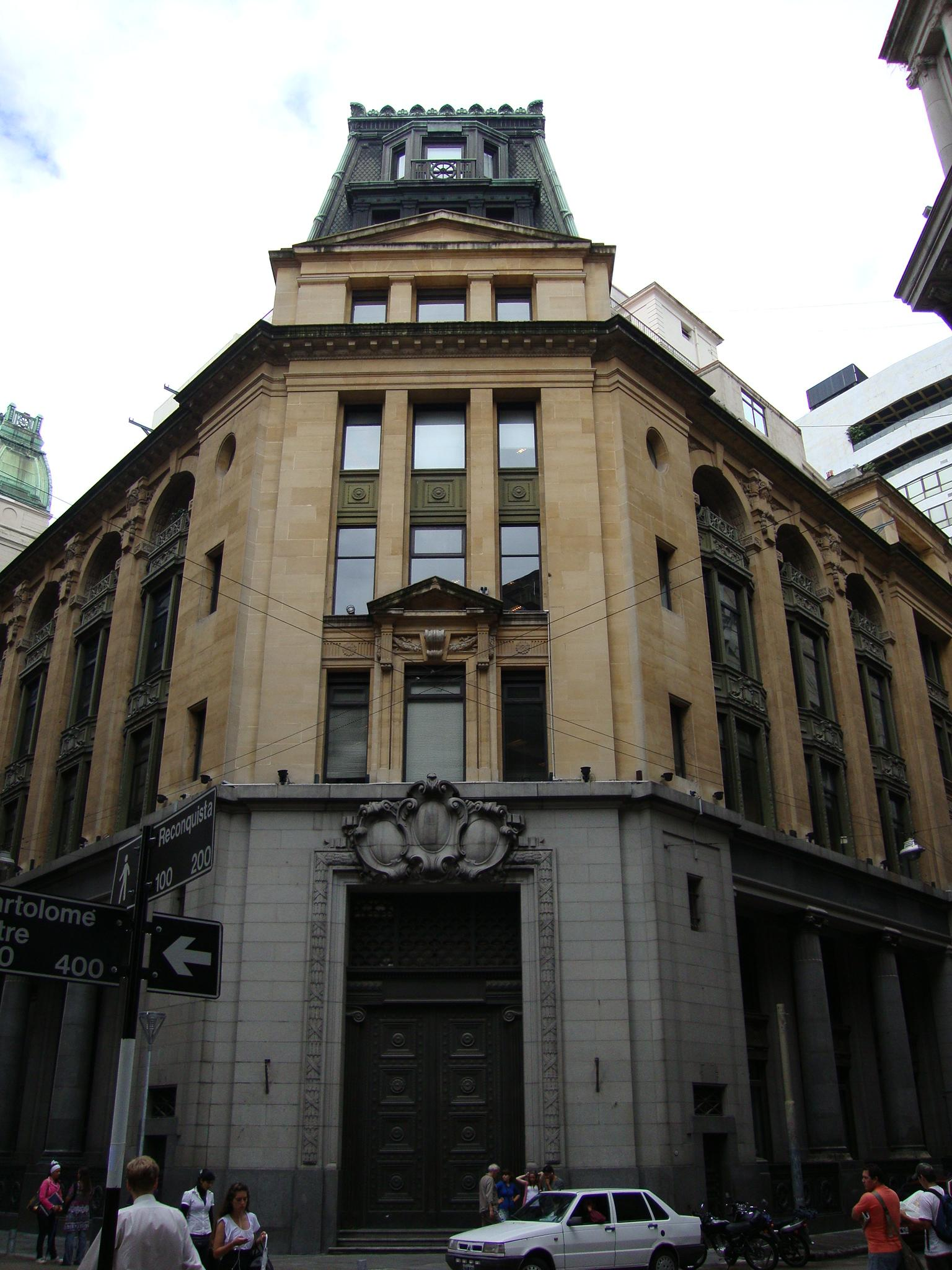
The Palacio de la Reconquista, at one time the Buenos Aires branch of the Anglo-South American Bank.

The Anglo-South American Bank was a British and Argentine bank established with the acquisition of the Anglo-Argentine Bank in 1900 by the Bank of Tarapacá and London. The new bank first took the name of Bank of Tarapacá and Argentina, which it changed in 1907 to Anglo-South American Bank.

== History ==
A partnership led by John Thomas North, a prominent British investor, became interested in Chile’s expanding nitrate industry, and founded the Bank of Tarapacá and London in 1888; Chile had annexed the Peruvian Province of Tarapacá in 1883, at the conclusion of the War of the Pacific. Later, the bank added the coffee and cocoa business to its interests. A part of the vast financial network supporting the British Empire, it was an overseas bank with its head office in London, and the bulk of its operations abroad.

By the turn of the century, the bank was looking for opportunities outside Chile. It was interested in Buenos Aires, but four British banks were already there, which meant that a new entrant would have difficulty breaking into the market. The Bank of Tarapaca and London therefore decided that it would buy the smallest of the British banks, the Anglo-Argentine Bank, which had been established in 1889 and which had a branch in Buenos Aires and another in Montevideo, Uruguay. The Bank of Tarapacá and Argentina carved out a niche in business with Belgium, cooperating with Belgian banks and securing accounts from Belgian firms. It also had a branch in Germany and gained an account at the Bank of England.

In 1910, the Bank acquired a minority stake in Commercial Bank of Spanish America, acquiring control in 1917, but operating it separately. The Commercial Bank traced its ancestry through the Cortés Commercial and Banking Company back to Banco de Nicaragua, founded in Managua in 1888. The Banco de Nicaragua was engaged in financing the coffee trade. The bank registered in England in 1893, changing its name to London Bank of Central America. In 1891, Banco Particular de El Salvador (est. 1885 in El Salvador), merged with the branch there of London Bank of Central America under the name Banco Salvadoreño; today, this bank is HSBC El Salvador, SA, part of the HSBC group. In 1904 the London Bank of Central America merged with the firm of Enrique Cortés and Company and became the Cortés Commercial and Banking Company. Eventually, in 1911, the Board of Directors changed the name to the Commercial Bank of Spanish America.

Its landmark Argentine headquarters, in the heart of the Buenos Aires financial district, was designed by British architects Paul Bell Chambers and Louis Newbery Thomas in 1912. The ornate building, designed in the Academic style that characterized numerous Argentine bank buildings at the time, was completed in 1920, and is known as the Palacio de la Reconquista for its 46 Reconquista Street address.

World War I hurt the Commercial Bank, leading many of its shareholders to sell a majority of the shares to the Anglo-South American. With the acquisition, the Bank now controlled branches in Argentina (in Buenos Aires, Mendoza, and Bahía Blanca), Bolivia, Central America, Colombia, Cuba, Ecuador, Mexico, Peru, Uruguay, and Venezuela. In 1926, the Bank took over the Commercial Bank's branches in Central America, Colombia, Ecuador, and Venezuela.

In 1920 the Bank took over the British Bank of South America, and 60 per cent of the shares of a private banking firm, Banco de A. Edwards y Cía., in Chile. The British Bank of South America traced its origins back to 1862, when it began as the Brazilian and Portuguese Bank. It changed its name in 1866 to the English Bank of Rio de Janeiro. In 1891, its directors sold the bank to local investors and used the proceeds to found a new bank, the British Bank of South America. It conducted operations in Brazil and Argentina, where it had branches in Buenos Aires and Rosario. Agustín Edwards Ossandón had founded Banco de A. Edwards y Cía in 1867; it issued banknotes in Chilean pesos and also pounds sterling.

In the late 1920s and early 1930s the development of synthetic nitrates and the Great Depression harmed business for the Anglo-South American. In 1936, the Anglo-South American went into liquidation. Its chief rival, the Bank of London and South America (BOLSA) then took over many of its operations. Banco A. Edwards, for instance, continued as a BOLSA subsidiary, and was acquired by Midland Bank in 1987; these were, in turn, acquired by HSBC Bank Argentina in 1997, and Edwards' Chilean operations (its last by that name) were merged into Banco de Chile in 2001.

== Sources ==
- Graham, Richard. 1972. Britain and the Onset of Modernization in Brazil, 1850-1914. (Cambridge University Press).
- Jones, Geoffrey. 1995. British Multinational Banking 1830-1990. (London: Oxford University Press).
- Joslin, David. 1963. A Century of Banking in Latin America. (London: Oxford University Press).
- Rippy, J. Fred. 1948. "British Investments in Latin America, 1939," Journal of Political Economy Vol. 56, No. 1, pp. 63–68.
