= Bank of London and Montreal =

Bank of the Bahamas

- Type: Joint venture
- Industry: Banking and financial services
- Founded: 1958; 68 years ago
- Defunct: 1971; 55 years ago
- Successor: Lloyds and Bolsa International Bank
- Headquarters: Nassau, The Bahamas
- Parent: Bank of London and South America and Bank of Montreal

The Bank of London and Montreal Limited was a joint venture between the Bank of London and South America (BOLSA), a subsidiary of Lloyds Bank, and the Bank of Montreal. It was established in 1958 and headquartered in Nassau, Bahamas.

== History ==
In 1958, Bank of London and South America, a partner of Lloyds Bank, and Bank of Montreal set up Bank of London and Montreal as a 50-50 joint venture with its main office in Nassau, Bahamas. Bank of Montreal provided capital, and BOLSA contributed its branches in northern South America and the West Indies. In 1959, the Bank of London and Montreal (BOLAM) opened a branch in Jamaica. In 1960, BOLAM established a branch in Trinidad. In 1965, Mellon National Bank bought 15% of BOLAM's shares. Lloyds' stake dropped to 24 percent. Bolam closed its offices in Venezuela and bought a lot of shares in Banco La Guaira Internacional, which had branches in Caracas and La Guaira. The Bank of England let Mellon raise its stake to 25% in 1968.

BOLSA bought BOLAM in 1970. BOLAM had 28 branches all over Latin America and the Caribbean. The Bank of Montreal sold its branches and operations in Trinidad and Tobago to the government there, which then used the money to start a new bank called National Commercial Bank. This is now the First Citizens Bank. The Bank of Montreal took over the branches on April 17, 1970, and they became Bank of Montreal (Bahamas & Caribbean). In 1983, they changed the name to Bank of Montreal Bahamas Limited.

In 1971, the Jamaican government bought the Bank of Montreal's Jamaican operations and changed the name to Bank of Surrey. Five months later, the Bank of Surrey closed. In 1988, the Bank of Montreal said it would close its operations in the Bahamas. The Bahamas government stepped in to keep them open. The Bahamas government and Euro Canadian Bank worked together to start a business together. Euro Canadian Bank then took over the new bank and changed its name to Bank of The Bahamas. This is now the International Bank of the Bahamas.

In 1971, Lloyds merged Lloyds Bank Europe, BOLSA, and BOLAM to create a new bank named Lloyds and Bolsa International Bank. Lloyds owned 55%, and Mellon Bank owned 13%. Within two years, Lloyds bought out Mellon Bank and the other minority shareholders. After that, it changed the name of the bank to Lloyds Bank International (LBI).

LBI shut down the Tokyo branch that BOLAM had opened in 1971 in 1975.

In 1984, Lloyds merged into LBI.

== Coat of Arms ==
The bank was granted a coat of arms by the College of Arms in March 1960.

Coat of arms of Bank of London and Montreal Limited

Granted
22 March 1960.
Crest
On a wreath of the colours, A morion Or.
Escutcheon
Quarterly gules and argent, a cross quarterly counterchanged between in the first quarter a maple leaf slipped in autumnal tints proper, in the second quarter a sword erect also gules, in the third quarter an ancient ship sails set also proper pennon and flags flying argent each charged with a cross of St. George, and in the fourth quarter a plate charged with a saltire likewise gules.
