= Bank of London and South America =

British bank in South America

- Native name: Banco de Londres y América del Sur
- Type: Subsidiary undertaking
- Industry: Banking and financial services
- Predecessor: London and River Plate Bank; London and Brazilian Bank
- Founded: 1923; 103 years ago
- Defunct: 1971; 55 years ago
- Successor: Lloyds and Bolsa International Bank
- Headquarters: Buenos Aires, Argentina
- Parent: Lloyds Bank Limited

The Bank of London and South America Limited (BOLSA; Spanish: Banco de Londres y América del Sur, also known simply as Banco de Londres) was a British bank, which operated in South America between 1923 and 1971.

== Origins ==
The bank's predecessor was incorporated in England on 27 September 1862 as the London, Buenos Ayres and River Plate Bank (Banco de Londres, Buenos Ayres y Río de la Plata), originally to operate in Buenos Aires. The bank soon opened branches elsewhere in Argentina, and it changed its name in 1865 to the London and River Plate Bank (Banco de Londres y Río de la Plata).

The bank expanded over the years to have operations in Uruguay, Brazil and Chile. In 1918, it was acquired by Lloyds Bank Limited.

In 1923, Lloyds Bank brought about a merger with the separately owned London and Brazilian Bank, to prevent the two banks being in direct competition with each other. The merged bank was renamed as the Bank of London and South America (BOLSA). Lloyds retained a major interest in BOLSA throughout its subsequent history.

== History ==
In 1936, BOLSA took over many of the operations of its chief rival, the Anglo-South American Bank, which had gone into liquidation. The acquisitions included Banco de A. Edwards, one of the largest banks in Chile.

In 1958, the bank formed a joint venture with the Bank of Montreal, known as the Bank of London and Montreal (BOLAM), headquartered in Nassau, Bahamas. BOLSA contributed its branches in Central and northern South America to the joint venture. In 1970, BOLSA bought out its joint venture partners, and regained its branches in Central America, Colombia, Ecuador and Peru, but not its branches in Venezuela, which BOLAM had closed in 1965.

In 1971, Lloyds Bank bought the controlling interest in BOLSA and merged it with Lloyds Bank Europe to form Lloyds and Bolsa International Bank. This became Lloyds Bank International in 1974 and was merged into Lloyds Bank in 1986. Banco de A. Edwards was sold in 1987 to Midland Bank, part of HSBC since 1992, and merged into Banco de Chile in 2001.

== Headquarters ==
In 1966, the bank opened a new local headquarters in central Buenos Aires, designed by Argentine architect Clorindo Testa. It is one of the best examples of brutalism in Argentine architecture.

== Collections ==
In 1969 BOLSA deposited its archive on indefinite loan with University College London; Lloyds Bank International confirmed this deposit in 1982. The archive contains over 1000 volumes of letter books and accounting records, with correspondence relating primarily to Uruguay, Brazil, Argentina, and Chile.

== Arms ==
Coat of arms of Bank of London and South America

Notes
Granted 4 September 1960.
Crest
On a wreath of the colours a condor rising Or.
Escutcheon
Quarterly Argent and Gules in the first and fourth quarters a sword point upwards of the second and in the second and third quarters a Spanish galleon in full sail flags flying of the first in the fesse point a Spanish morion helmet of the sixteenth century Or.
