= Degradation (knighthood) =

Removal of a knighthood or other honour

Degradation is the formal term for removal of a knighthood or other honour. Modern degradation is an administrative process without public ceremony. Historically, degradation as a result of the most severe misdeeds — especially treason — was done in a public ceremony, at which the person’s spurs were broken, belt cut and sword broken over their head.

The last knight to be publicly degraded was Sir Francis Mitchell in 1621. Recent examples of degradation include Sir Roger Casement, whose knighthood was canceled for treason during the First World War, and Sir Anthony Blunt, whose knighthood was withdrawn in 1979.

Some of the most recent degradations centre on the fallout from the banking crisis at the end of the first decade of the twenty-first century. Examples include Sir Fred Goodwin, the former chief executive of the Royal Bank of Scotland, who lost his knighthood in 2012 over his role in the bank's near-collapse in 2008 and Sir James Crosby, the former chief executive of HBOS.

== See also ==
- Revocation
- List of revocations of appointments to orders and awarded decorations and medals of the United Kingdom
