= Peter Burt =

Scottish businessman (1944 – 2017)

Sir Peter Burt
- Born: Peter Alexander Burt; 6 March 1944; East Africa
- Died: 28 November 2017 (aged 73)
- Education: University of St Andrews; Wharton School, University of Pennsylvania
- Occupations: Businessman, banking executive
- Years active: 1975–2003
- Known for: Chief Executive and Governor of the Bank of Scotland
- Title: Former Chief Executive and Governor, Bank of Scotland
- Board member of: Chairman, ITV plc; Non-executive director, Royal Dutch Shell
- Awards: Fellow of the Royal Society of Edinburgh (FRSE)

Sir Peter Alexander Burt FRSE (6 March 1944 – 28 November 2017) was a Scottish businessman, former chief executive and later governor of the Bank of Scotland.

== Early life ==
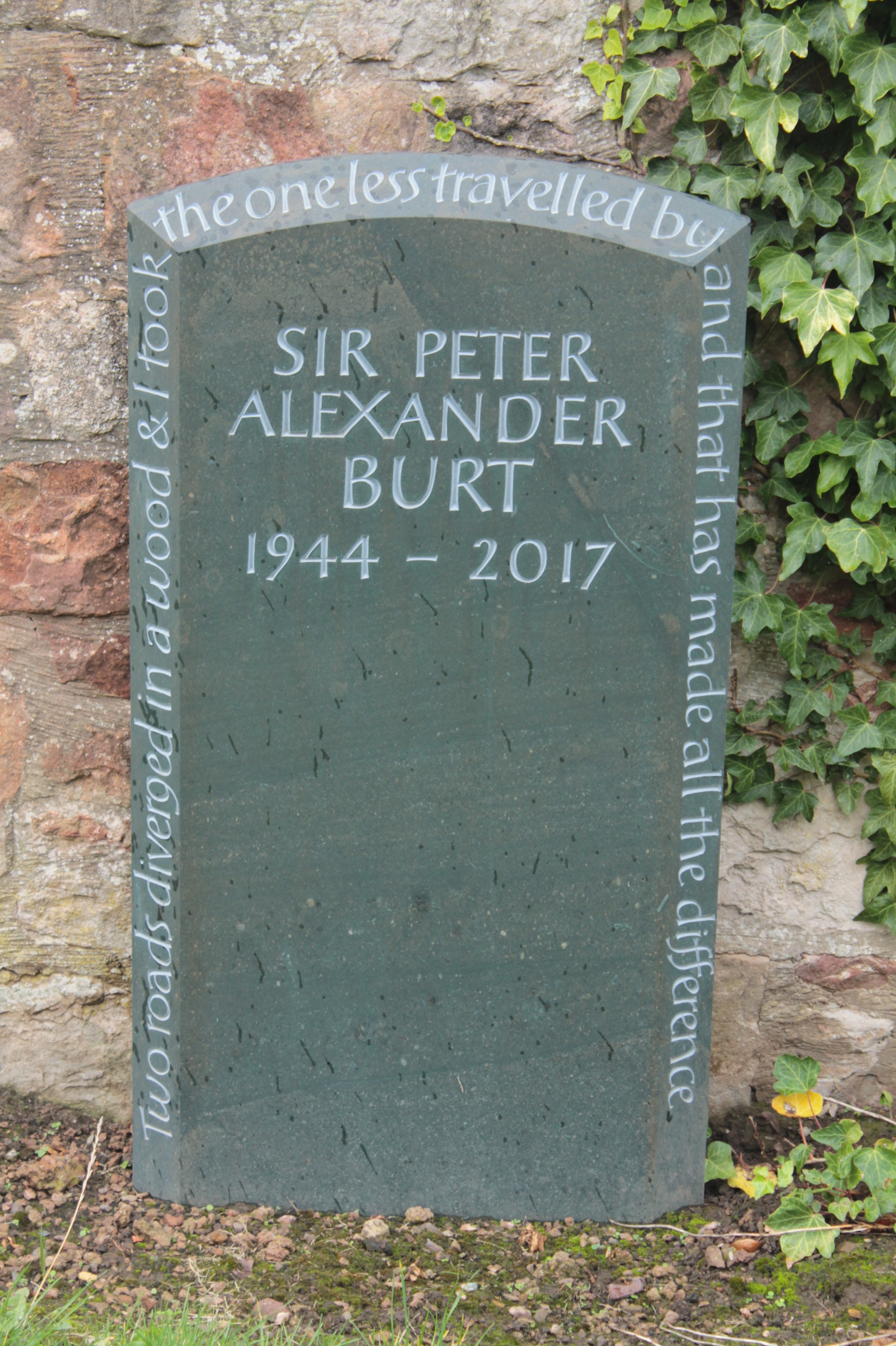
The grave of Sir Peter Burt, Whitekirk graveyard

Burt was born in 1944 in East Africa, and educated in Scotland. He graduated from the University of St Andrews and the University of Pennsylvania's Wharton School and later worked in the computer industry in California and Scotland.

== Bank of Scotland ==
Burt joined the Bank of Scotland in 1975, working in the international and oil and energy department. He rose to become head of the international division in 1985, treasurer and chief general manager in 1988 and eventually Chief Executive in 1996.

The main events of his stewardship were the failed takeover bid for the NatWest Bank and the merger with Halifax plc to form HBOS. Following the merger, he served as deputy chairman of HBOS and Governor of the Bank of Scotland, (a largely ceremonial role) from 2001 to 2003, and left the board afterwards.

By September 2008 HBOS was revealed to be in a poor financial condition and word broke of advanced merger talks with Lloyds TSB, the reports were later confirmed. In light of this development, news surfaced on 8 November of a letter from Burt and his contemporary Sir George Mathewson to HBOS Chairman Lord Stevenson. The letter recommended the immediate resignation of Lord Stevenson and HBOS Chief Executive Andy Hornby. The letter explained that the roles of chairman and chief executive would be filled by Mathewson and Burt respectively and that HBOS would continue to trade as an independent bank majority owned by The Treasury. However, the proposal was rejected by the bank in a swift response by Lord Stevenson and failed to win the endorsement of the UK Government The proposal was withdrawn on 20 November 2008.

== Other work ==
In 2004, he was appointed chairman of ITV plc. He also served as a non-executive director of Royal Dutch Shell until 2006, Chairman of Dyslexia Scotland and on the boards of a number of charities.

He died in 2017 and is buried in the northern extension to Whitekirk graveyard in East Lothian.
