= List of revocations of appointments to orders and awarded decorations and medals of the United Kingdom =

Many recipients of orders, decorations, and medals of the United Kingdom have had them revoked, often following conviction for crimes or breaches of military discipline, or when their conduct has been widely considered discreditable. In other cases, prominent nationals of countries with which the UK has later found itself at war or in dispute have had their honours revoked.

== Victoria Cross ==
All 8 revocations were restored to the Victoria Cross register by King George V in the 1920s.

Date of revocation	Recipient	Date of appointment	Reason	Notes
1861	Valentine Bambrick	1858	Convicted of assault and theft of a comrade's medals	
1861	Edward St John Daniel	1857	Convicted of desertion and evading court-martial	
1862	James McGuire	1858	Convicted of stealing a cow	
1872	Michael Murphy	1859	Convicted of theft	
1881	Thomas Lane	1861	Convicted of desertion and theft	
1884	Frederick Corbett	1883	Convicted of embezzlement and theft from an officer	
1895	James Collis	1881	Convicted of bigamy	
1908	George Ravenhill	1901	Convicted of theft	Name was never formally struck from the Victoria Cross register

== Military Cross ==
Date of revocation	Recipient	Date of award	Reason	Notes
1921	Major Ewen Cameron Bruce	1917	Convicted of robbing a creamery	Also stripped of DSO status
1936	Lieutenant-Colonel Denis Daly	1919	Convicted by court-martial of "offences against men in his employ"	Also stripped of DSO status
2014	Major Robert Armstrong	2009	The medal citation may not have been accurate in its details.	
2016	Captain William Boreham	2012	Senior officers exaggerated his bravery	

== Privy Council ==
Date of revocation	Recipient	Date of appointment	Reason	Notes
2 March 1687	Sir Thomas Chicheley	1670	Fell from favour	
23 June 1692	John Churchill, 1st Earl of Marlborough	14 February 1689	Being suspected of intrigues with the deposed former King James II	Restored 19 June 1698
23 June 1692	Charles Talbot, 12th Earl of Shrewsbury	14 February 1689	Being suspected of intrigues with the deposed former King James II	Restored 4 March 1694
September 1714	James Butler, 2nd Duke of Ormonde	6 April 1696	Struck out of the list after the accession of King George I	Attainted 20 August 1715
January 1721	John Aislabie		Convicted of corruption	
7 November 1724	Thomas Coningsby, 1st Earl Coningsby	13 April 1693	Result of a petition from the Leominster corporation arising from his "tyranny and injustice" as a landowner there	
31 May 1725	Thomas Parker, 1st Earl of Macclesfield	30 March 1710	Convicted of corruption and fined £30,000	
1 July 1731	William Pulteney	6 July 1716	Wrote an offensive pamphlet against both Robert Walpole and King George II	Restored 20 February 1742
25 April 1760	Lord George Sackville	27 January 1758	Failed to obey orders to bring up the cavalry at the Battle of Minden	Restored 20 December 1765
1781	Henry Flood	20 September 1776	Struck out of the list "by the King's own hand"	
9 May 1798	Charles James Fox	30 March 1782	Made a toast to the sovereignty of the people	Readmitted 5 February 1806
9 May 1805	Henry Dundas, 1st Viscount Melville	31 July 1782	Following criticism in the Tenth Report of the Naval Commissioners of Inquiry	Readmitted 8 April 1807
13 December 1921	Sir Edgar Speyer, 1st Bt	22 November 1909	Pro-German activities during World War I	
23 June 1963	John Profumo	8 February 1960	Admitted to giving a false statement to Parliament following an affair	Also resigned as Secretary of State for War and Member of Parliament for Stratford-on-Avon; Later appointed CBE
17 August 1976	John Stonehouse	28 June 1968	Convicted of theft and false pretences, and being sentenced to seven years' imprisonment	Also resigned as Member of Parliament for Walsall North
26 June 1997	Jonathan Aitken	21 July 1994	Following his withdrawal from a libel case; police had begun investigating him for perjury	
8 June 2011	Elliot Morley	19 December 2006	United Kingdom parliamentary expenses scandal	
13 March 2013	Chris Huhne	13 May 2010	Pleaded guilty to perverting the course of justice	
10 October 2013	Denis MacShane	April 2002	United Kingdom parliamentary expenses scandal	
6 November 2013	John Prescott, Baron Prescott	27 July 1994	In protest at the delay in granting the Royal Charter on self-regulation of the press	
14 April 2018	Sir Seamus Treacy	12 January 2018	Requested to be removed	
13 April 2022	P. J. Patterson	1993	In recognition of a consensus in Jamaica that there should be a locally chosen head of state	
10 March 2026	Peter Mandelson, Baron Mandelson	1998	His association with paedophile Jeffrey Epstein	Also resigned from the House of Lords
8 July 2026	Sir Jeffrey Donaldson	2007	Convicted of 18 counts of sex abuse	Also later stripped of knight bachelor status
8 July 2026	Craig Williams	15 November 2023	2024 United Kingdom general election betting scandal	

== Order of the Garter ==
Date of revocation	Recipient	Date of appointment	Reason	Notes
1915	Wilhelm II, German Emperor and King of Prussia	1877	World War I	Also stripped of Royal Victorian Chain and honorary GCVO status
1915	Franz Joseph I, Emperor of Austria-Hungary	1867	World War I	Also stripped of Royal Victorian Chain
1915	Prince Heinrich of Prussia	1889	World War I	Also stripped of honorary GCB status and Royal Victorian Chain
1915	Ernst Ludwig, Grand Duke of Hesse and by Rhine	1892	World War I	Also stripped of honorary GCB status and Royal Victorian Chain
1915	Wilhelm, German Crown Prince and Crown Prince of Prussia	1901	World War I	Also stripped of Royal Victorian Chain
1915	Ernst August, Crown Prince of Hanover and Duke of Cumberland and Teviotdale	1878	World War I	Later stripped of the titles Prince of the United Kingdom of Great Britain and Ireland, Duke of Cumberland and Teviotdale and Earl of Armagh by the Titles Deprivation Act 1917
1915	Carl Eduard, Duke of Saxe-Coburg and Gotha and Duke of Albany	1902	World War I	Also stripped of honorary GCVO status; later stripped of the titles of Prince of the United Kingdom of Great Britain and Ireland, Duke of Albany, Earl of Clarence and Baron Arklow by the Titles Deprivation Act 1917
1915	Wilhelm II, King of Württemberg	1904	World War I	
1941	Vittorio Emanuele, King of Italy	1891	World War II	Also stripped of honorary GCB status and Royal Victorian Chain
1941	Hirohito, Emperor of Japan	1929	World War II	Restored in 1971
2025	Andrew Mountbatten-Windsor	2006	Disfavour following a friendship with the convicted sex offender Jeffrey Epstein	Earlier in the same year stripped of the titles Prince of the United Kingdom of Great Britain and Northern Ireland, Duke of York, Earl of Inverness and Baron Killyleagh on the King's orders. Also stripped of GCVO status

== Order of the Bath ==
=== Knight Companion ===
Date of revocation	Recipient	Date of appointment	Reason	Notes
1814	Thomas Cochrane, Lord Cochrane	1809	Great Stock Exchange Fraud of 1814	Later appointed GCB in 1847

=== Knight Grand Cross ===
Date of revocation	Recipient	Date of appointment	Reason	Notes
1816	Eyre Coote	1815	"Conduct unworthy of an officer and a gentleman"	
1915	Prince Heinrich of Prussia	1889	World War I	Also stripped of KG status and Royal Victorian Chain
1915	Ernst Ludwig, Grand Duke of Hesse and by Rhine	1892	World War I	Also stripped of KG status and Royal Victorian Chain
1940	Benito Mussolini	1923	World War II	
1941	Vittorio Emanuele, King of Italy	1891	World War II	Also stripped of KG status and Royal Victorian Chain
1989	Nicolae Ceaușescu	1978	Convicted of economic sabotage and genocide	Stripped the day before his execution
25 June 2008	Robert Mugabe	1994	On the advice of the Foreign Secretary	

=== Knight Commander ===
Date of revocation	Recipient	Date of appointment	Reason	Notes
1 October 2026	Ben Key	2020	Falling "far short of the values and standards expected of service personnel"	Also stripped of CBE status

=== Companion ===
Date of revocation	Recipient	Date of appointment	Reason	Notes
1918	Colonel Percy Holland	1913	Possibly for writing letters of an incriminating sexual nature to Sidney Harry Fox	
1975	George Pottinger	1972	Convicted of corruptly receiving gifts from architect John Poulson	Also stripped of CVO status
2013	Vicky Pryce	2009	Convicted of conspiracy to pervert the course of justice	

== Order of St Michael and St George ==
=== Knight Grand Cross ===
Date of revocation	Recipient	Date of appointment	Reason	Notes
1931	Owen Philipps, 1st Baron Kylsant	1918	Convicted of fraud for issuing a misleading stock prospectus	Also stripped of KStJ status

=== Companion ===
Date of revocation	Recipient	Date of appointment	Reason	Notes
1880	James Craig Loggie	1873	Convicted of embezzlement and misappropriation of money	
1916	Roger Casement	1905	Convicted of high treason	Stripped prior to his execution; also stripped of knight bachelor status
1920	Lieutenant-Colonel Sydney Douglas Rumbold	1919		Also stripped of DSO status

== Royal Victorian Chain ==
Date of revocation	Recipient	Date of appointment	Reason	Notes
1915	Wilhelm II, German Emperor and King of Prussia	1877	World War I	Also stripped of KG and honorary GCVO statuses
1915	Franz Joseph I, Emperor of Austria-Hungary	1867	World War I	Also stripped of KG status
1915	Prince Heinrich of Prussia	1889	World War I	Also stripped of KG and honorary GCB statuses
1915	Ernst Ludwig, Grand Duke of Hesse and by Rhine	1892	World War I	Also stripped of KG and honorary GCB statuses
1915	Wilhelm, German Crown Prince and Crown Prince of Prussia	1901	World War I	Also stripped of KG status
1941	Vittorio Emanuele, King of Italy	1891	World War II	Also stripped of KG and honorary GCB statuses
1942	Nobuhito, Prince Takamatsu	1930	World War II	

== Royal Victorian Order ==
=== Knight Grand Cross ===
Date of revocation	Recipient	Date of appointment	Reason	Notes
1915	Wilhelm II, German Emperor and King of Prussia	1877	World War I	Also stripped of KG status and Royal Victorian Chain
1915	Carl Eduard, Duke of Saxe-Coburg and Gotha and Duke of Albany	1902	World War I	Also stripped of KG status; later stripped of the titles of Prince of the United Kingdom of Great Britain and Ireland, Duke of Albany, Earl of Clarence and Baron Arklow by the Titles Deprivation Act 1917
1915	Prince Leopold of Bavaria	1907	World War I	
2025	Andrew Mountbatten-Windsor	2011	Disfavour following a friendship with the convicted sex offender Jeffrey Epstein	Also stripped of KG status; earlier stripped of the titles of Prince of the United Kingdom of Great Britain and Northern Ireland, Duke of York, Earl of Inverness and Baron Killyleagh

=== Knight Commander ===
Date of revocation	Recipient	Date of appointment	Reason	Notes
1979	Anthony Blunt	1956	Exposed as a member of the Cambridge Five	

=== Commander ===
Date of revocation	Recipient	Date of appointment	Reason	Notes
1948	Major FitzRoy Hubert Fyers	1939	Convicted of "persistently importuning male persons for an immoral purpose at South Kensington District Railway Station"	
1975	George Pottinger	1953	Convicted of corruption	Also stripped of CB status
2018	Hubert Chesshyre	2003	Found to have committed child sexual abuse offences in a trial of the facts	

=== Member ===
Member (fifth class) prior to 1984

Date of revocation	Recipient	Date of appointment	Reason	Notes
1911	The Rev. Frederic Percival Farrar	1911		
2004	Cyril Littlewood	2001	Convicted of sexual abuse	Also stripped of MBE status
2007	Michael Joseph Delaney	2005		
2017	Ronald Clifford Harper	2004	Convicted of conspiracy to make corrupt payments	

== Order of the Indian Empire ==
=== Companion ===
Date of revocation	Recipient	Date of appointment	Reason	Notes
1921	Lieutenant-Colonel Eknath Hathi	1917		

== Knight Bachelor ==
Date of revocation	Recipient	Date of appointment	Reason	Notes
1916	Roger Casement	1911	Convicted of high treason	Also stripped of CMG status
1918	Joseph Jonas	1905	Convicted of a misdemeanour	
1980	Joseph Kagan, Baron Kagan	1970	Convicted of theft	
1991	Jack Lyons	1967	Convicted of fraud	Also stripped of CBE status
1993	Commissioner Terry Lewis	1986	Convicted of perjury, corruption and forgery	Also stripped of OBE status and QPM
2012	Fred Goodwin	2004	Criticism of his conduct as Chief Executive of the Royal Bank of Scotland Group	
2013	James Crosby	2006	Criticism of his conduct as Chief Executive of Halifax Bank	
2014	Alan Seymour Davies	2000	Convicted of false accounting	
2015	George Castledine	2007	Struck off the nursing register for sexual misconduct	
2016	Allan Kemakeza	2001	Convicted of demanding money with menace, intimidation and larceny	
2021	Ron Brierley	1988	Charged with possessing child abuse material	
2026	Jeffrey Donaldson	2016	Convicted of 18 counts of sex abuse	Also stripped of status as a member of the Privy Council

== Order of the British Empire ==
=== Knight/Dame Commander ===
Date of revocation	Recipient	Date of appointment	Reason	Notes
1980	Albert Henry	1974	Convicted of electoral fraud	
2011	Jean Else	2001	Banned from running a school by General Teaching Council for England misconduct hearing	First and to date only dame to have an honour revoked

=== CBE ===
- 1921: Lieutenant-Colonel Basil John Blenkinsop Coulson (appointed 1920)
- 1923: Richard Williamson (appointed 1918), following his conviction for indecent conduct towards young girls
- 1940: Vidkun Quisling (appointed 1929), following his collaboration with Nazi Germany in the occupation of Norway.
- 1967: Thomas Chambers Windsor Roe (appointed 1953), following his conviction in Switzerland for fraud
- 1975: John Alan Maudsley (appointed 1970), following his conviction for bribery
- 1977: George Wilfred Newman (appointed 1966), following his conviction for corruption
- 1990: Edmund Rouse (appointed 1987), following his conviction for bribery.
- 1991: Jack Lyons (appointed 1967), following his conviction for fraud. Also stripped of knighthood.
- 2000: John Kevin Ashcroft (appointed 1989) following his conviction for breach of fiduciary duties.
- 2001: Freddie Emery-Wallis (appointed 1999), following his conviction for sexual abuse.
- 2005: Jim Speechley (appointed 1992) following his conviction for misconduct in a public office.
- 2012: Edward John Roberts (appointed 1993) following his conviction for sexual abuse.
- 2013: Chief Fire Officer Francis John Sheehan (appointed 2008) after being cautioned for making indecent images of children.
- 2015: Rolf Harris (appointed 2006) following his 2014 conviction for twelve indecent assaults on four girls aged from seven or eight to 19 between 1968 and 1986.
- 2015: Joanne Shuter (appointed 2010) following her conviction for expenses fraud.
- 2017: Paula Vasco-Knight (appointed 2014) following her conviction for fraud.
- 2020: Harvey Weinstein (appointed 2004), following his conviction for sexual abuse.
- 2024: Paula Vennells (appointed 2019), following public criticism of her handling of the British Post Office scandal.
- 2026: Ben Key (appointed 2015)

=== OBE ===
- 1921: Lieutenant-Colonel Cecil Malone MP (appointed 1919), following his conviction under the Defence of the Realm (Acquisition of Land) Act 1920
- 1922: Captain Reginald Stuart Lindsell (appointed 1919) "in consequence of his having been dismissed from His Majesty's Service by sentence of a General Court Martial" following his dismissal from the Army by a General Court-martial.
- 1922: Captain Arthur Henry Jolliffe (appointed 1919) "in consequence of his having been cashiered and sentenced to imprisonment by sentence of a General Court-martial" having been cashiered and sentenced to imprisonment by a General Court-martial.
- 1922: Captain John Stuart Broadbent (appointed 1919) "in consequence of his having been convicted by the Civil Power."
- 1924: Major Hugh Lidwell Flack (appointed 1919) following a civil conviction.
- 1924: Major Charles James Napier (appointed 1919) following a civil conviction
- 1924: Frank Carlyle Kieller Mitchell (appointed 1918) following a conviction and 21-month sentence for "fraudulently converting to his own use three-cheques of the value of £5,787, the property of his employers"
- 1925: Ernest Brooks (appointed 1920) also stripped of British Empire Medal
- 1926: Lieutenant-Colonel James Christie (appointed 1919), "in consequence of his having been convicted by a Civil Court"
- 1943: Colonel (Sir) Edgar Henry Newton (appointed 1937), "in consequence of his having been dismissed from His Majesty's Service by sentence of a General Court-Martial"
- 1947: Lieutenant-Colonel Philip Henry Tedman (appointed 1945) following his dismissal from service following a Field General Court-Martial.
- 1947: Lieutenant-Colonel William Stewart (appointed 1945)
- 1949: Squadron Leader Hugh Murray (appointed 1944), " in consequence of his having been cashiered by sentence of a General Court Martial."
- 1949: Man Wai Wong (appointed 1947), following his conviction for outlawry in Malaya.
- 1950: Colonel Louis Pedretti (appointed 1944) having been cashiered and sentenced to three-years in prison for corruption by a general court-martial, he received bribes totalling £8,500 from Egyptian contractors.
- 1950: Wing Commander Alan Lennox Thomson Naish (appointed 1946), following bankruptcy.
- 1961: Stephen Mackenzie (appointed 1949) following his court-martial and discharge.
- 1965: Kim Philby (appointed 1946), following his exposure as a double agent.
- 1966: William Gordon Tong (appointed 1960), following conviction and being sentenced to two-years in prison for obtaining money by false pretences and obtaining credit by fraud.
- 1979: David Tempest (appointed 1969)
- 1979: Colonel Frank Percival Nurdin (appointed 1969), following a conviction for corruption related to the sale of radio equipment for Chieftain tanks for Iran.
- 1988: Lester Piggott (appointed 1975), following his conviction for tax fraud.
- 1993: George Walter Hodgson (appointed 1983)
- 1993: Terry Lewis (appointed 1979); also stripped of knighthood
- 1994: James Taylor (appointed 1982)
- 1995: Commander Anthony Leslie Horton (appointed 1989)
- 1997: Richard Stuart Lines (appointed 1990) following his conviction for fraud.
- 2001: Philippe Le Roux (appointed 1990), following his conviction under the Financial Services Act 1986.
- 2000: Morgan Fahey, former Deputy Mayor of Christchurch, New Zealand (appointed 1977) following his conviction for sexual abuse.
- 2001: Robin David Peverett (appointed 1995), following his conviction for child abuse.
- 2001: Dr John Roylance (appointed 1994), following his conviction by the General Medical Council for serious professional misconduct in the Bristol heart scandal.
- 2005: Edward "Eddie" Aldridge (appointed 1996) following his conviction for fraud.
- 2006: Dennis Edward Grant (appointed 1984), following his conviction for sexual abuse.
- 2007: Bishop of Grafton Donald Shearman (appointed 1978), following his being defrocked for sexual assault.
- 2012: East Lothian Council Chief Executive John Lindsay (appointed 2005) following being fired for failing the council.
- 2013: Leslie Smith (appointed 1994), following his conviction for indecent assault
- 2013: Peter Nicholson (appointed 2005), following his conviction for fraud
- 2013: Michael C. Brewer (appointed 1995), following his conviction for five counts of indecent assault.
- 2013: Stuart Hall (appointed 2012), following his conviction for 14 sexual assaults.
- 2017: Philip Anthony Knight (appointed 2001)
- 2017: Patrick Rock (appointed 1992) after he was found guilty of making indecent images of children the previous year.
- 2017: Paul Symonds (appointed 2007) following allegations of child sex abuse.
- 2017: Anne Ganley (appointed 2013) following her conviction for perverting the course of justice.
- 2023: Anthony Bailey (appointed 2008) after he was found in contempt of court.
- 2023: McKeeva Bush (appointed 1997) following his conviction for assault.
- 2023: Richard Pallister (appointed 1996) following his conviction for sex crimes.
- 2023: Major-General Nicholas Welch (appointed 2006) following his conviction for fraud.
- 2024: Anil Bhanot (appointed 2010)
- 2025: Commander Iain Fergusson (appointed 2024)
- 2025: Harry Legg (appointed 1992)
- 2025: Jan Latham-Koenig (appointed 2022)
- 2025: Richard Evans (appointed 2022)
- 2026: Anthony James Reilly (appointed 2010)
- 2026: Anantkumar Meghji Pethraj Shah (appointed 2020)
- 2026: Maqdsood Ahmad (appointed 2010)
- 2026: Ian Hudson (appointed 2019)
- 2026: Nirpal Singh Riat (appointed 2010)

=== MBE ===
- 1921: Lieutenant Ernest Middleton (appointed 1919) in "consequence of his having been cashiered by sentence of a General Court-Martial"
- 1921: Harry William John Wilkinson (appointed 1919) "in consequence of his having been convicted by the Civil Power"
- 1921: Shakar Khan (appointed 1919); appointment restored in 1931
- 1922: Lieutenant James George Annand Forbes (appointed 1919) "in consequence of his having been convicted by the Civil Power"
- 1922: Captain John Stuart Broadbent (appointed 1919), "in consequence of his having been convicted by the Civil Power."
- 1922: Captain Ernest Robert Powell (appointed 1918)
- 1923: Major Edward Seymour Odell (appointed 1919)
- 1923: Major Ernest Frederick Strachan (appointed 1919)
- 1923: Lieutenant John Morgan Knight (appointed 1919)
- 1924: Captain Douglas McLaren (appointed 1918)
- 1925: Leicester Philip Sydney (appointed 1920)
- 1925: Captain Arthur Nowell Broad (appointed 1919)
- 1925: James Alexander Webster (appointed 1920)
- 1926: Captain Michael John Hanney (appointed 1919), "in consequence of his having been convicted by the Civil Power"
- 1929: Edward Albert Rix (appointed 1926), "in consequence of his having been convicted by the Civil Power" on a charge of theft from the Receiver of the Metropolitan Police District
- 1929: Lee Peck Hock (appointed 1923), "in consequence of his having been convicted by the Civil Power" for bribery
- 1930: Francis George Clarkson (appointed 1918), "in consequence of his having been convicted by the Civil Power"
- 1934: Deputy Chief Constable William Jones (appointed 1920)
- 1936: Frank Jago Munford (appointed 1918), "in consequence of his having been convicted by the Civil Power"
- 1937: Deputy Chief Constable of Lincolnshire Police William Ewart Gladstone Trigg (appointed 1918), also stripped of King's Police Medal
- 1944: Robert Hutchison (appointed 1940) in "consequence of his having been dismissed from His Majesty's Service by sentence of a General Court-Martial"
- 1944: Captain Edwin Illirgworth (appointed 1943) in "consequence of his having been dismissed from His Majesty's Service by sentence of a General Court-Martial"
- 1949: Major Frank Reuben Williams (appointed 1944), "in consequence of his having been cashiered by sentence of a general court martial"
- 1949: Warrant Officer James Walter McDowell Day (appointed 1944), "in consequence of his having been convicted by a general court-martial and dismissed the Service"
- 1949: Thomas Steele Dolan (appointed 1945) for "having been convicted by the Civil Power"
- 1949: Frederick Donald Reiffer (appointed 1945) for "having been convicted by the Civil Power"
- 1950: Captain Francis Joseph Fone (appointed 1949), "in consequence of his having been convicted by the civil power"
- 1950: Major William Jardine Barnish (appointed 1945) was also stripped of his Territorial Efficiency Medal with two clasps.
- 1950: Captain Robert Charles Deboice Douglas (appointed 1947)
- 1950: Flight sergeant George Lofthouse (appointed 1945) was also stripped of two Mentioned in Despatches
- 1951: Flight Lieutenant John Edward Parr (appointed 1949)
- 1951: Major Emanuel Saphir (appointed 1945)
- 1951: Captain Frank Peter Edwards (appointed 1944)
- 1952: Major Frederick George Percy Hicks (appointed 1943)
- 1952: Major Kenneth Frank Morrill (appointed 1945)
- 1952: Captain Otto Nyquist (appointed 1946)
- 1952: Captain John Musgrave King (appointed 1946)
- 1955: Major Russell William Hatch (appointed 1945)
- 1956: Harry Holliday (appointed 1954)
- 1956: Captain Arthur James Britnell (appointed 1950)
- 1956: Major Frank William White (appointed 1944)
- 1958: Warrant Officer Class 1 Lionel Henry Bryson (appointed 1950)
- 1962: Hugh Hickman (appointed 1949)
- 1963: Lieutenant-Colonel John Sydney Noel Pounds (appointed 1949) as "consequence of him having been convicted by Court-Martial Service and dismissed from Her Majesty's War Office"
- 1965: Captain William Henry Eardley (appointed 1954)
- 1966: William Alexander McConnach (appointed 1952)
- 1967: Captain Leslie Gordon Creighton (appointed 1951)
- 1968: Lieutenant-Colonel Jack Constable Price Rowe (appointed 1943)
- 1969: Wing Commander Henry Lyons Webb (appointed 1959)
- 1969: Oliver Alfred Sidney Cutts (appointed 1963)
- 1973: Lieutenant Commander Leslie Albert Shipp (appointed 1972)
- 1975: William Spens, 2nd Baron Spens (appointed 1954), following his conviction for theft.
- 1980: Graham Griffiths (appointed 1970)
- 1986: Margaret Crowfoot (appointed 1977)
- 1986: Arthur Gerald Lee (appointed 1983).
- 1987: Major Peter John Darrington (appointed 1984), following his sentencing by Court-Martial.
- 1989: Edward Rutledge (appointed 1987)
- 1994: John Hanna Napier (appointed 1991)
- 1996: William John Johnston (appointed 1991)
- 1996: David Hardman (appointed 1994)
- 1996: Frederick Alwyn Oliver Jones (appointed 1994)
- 1997: Stanley Lewis Brown (appointed 1982), following his conviction for sexual abuse.
- 2000: Squadron Leader Brian Trood (appointed 1991), following his conviction for sexual assault.
- 2001: Cyril Albert Broom (appointed 1996)
- 2002: Phil Taylor (appointed 2000), following his conviction for sexual assault.
- 2004: Cyril Littlewood (appointed 1971), following his conviction for sexual abuse (MVO also revoked).
- 2006: Trevor Richardson (appointed 1998), following his conviction for child abuse
- 2006: Gordon Crearer Fulton Scott (appointed 1998), following his conviction for possession of child pornography.
- 2006: Jamnadas Virji Sudra (appointed 1996), following his conviction for sexual assault.
- 2006: Flight Lieutenant Michael Eke (appointed 2003), following his conviction for theft and deception.
- 2006: Naseem Hamed (appointed 1999), following his conviction for dangerous driving.
- 2008: Warrant Officer Class 2 Nicholas Charles McKeown (appointed 1997), following his conviction for possession of child pornography.
- 2009: Hooman Ghalamkari (appointed 11 June 2005), following conviction on charges of false accounting and theft of prescriptions relating to the pharmacy he ran.
- 2009: Peter Thomas Cornwell (appointed 2003).
- 2011: Junaid Quershi (appointed 1999) following his conviction for sex offences
- 2011: Henry Charles Day (appointed 2003) following his conviction for child sex offences.
- 2012: Dr Roselle Antoine (appointed 2005) following her conviction for conning foreign students into handing over thousands of pounds for bogus qualifications.
- 2012: Professor Charles Powys Butler (appointed 2005) following his conviction for fraudulently claiming almost £150,000 in expenses from the NHS.
- 2012: Ian John McClure (appointed 2000) following his conviction for child molestation.
- 2013: David Bradley (appointed 2007) after was found guilty of unacceptable professional conduct.
- 2013: David Russon (appointed 2001) after being found guilty of inappropriate behaviour in schools
- 2016: Jawaid Mohammed Ishaq (appointed 2000) following his conviction for fraud.
- 2017: Lee Anthony Bushill (appointed 2004)
- 2017: Robert Neville James Constable (appointed 1975) following his conviction for child sex offences.
- 2017: Adrian Lee Stone (appointed 2012) following his conviction for child sex offences.
- 2017 Robert Stanley Poots (appointed 2010) following his conviction for fraud, forgery and false accounting.
- 2017: Craig Martin Burrows (appointed 2004) following his conviction for child sex offences.
- 2017: Robert Lovegrove (appointed 1998)
- 2017: Philippa Ann Rodale (appointed 2007) following her conviction for animal welfare offences.
- 2017: David Kemp (appointed 2013) following conviction for child pornography.
- 2017: Scott Trevor Francis (appointed 2012) following conviction for child abuse.
- 2017: Derek Eaglestone (appointed 1994) following conviction for sex crimes.
- 2023: Peter Antonelli (appointed 2005) following conviction for sex crimes.
- 2023: Paul Cahill (appointed 2004)
- 2023: Dario Gradi (appointed 1998) for failing to protect children from sexual abuse.
- 2023: Paul Hogg (appointed 2016) following his conviction for sex crimes.
- 2023: Raymond Parry (appointed 2006) following his conviction for sexual assault.
- 2023: Krishna Singh (appointed 2013) following his conviction for sexual abuse.
- 2023: Jonathan Ullmer (appointed 2014)
- 2024: Richard Cowie (Wiley) (appointed 2018) following a series of antisemitic posts on social media.
- 2024: Hugh Morgan-Williams (appointed 2008)
- 2024: Robert Johnson (appointed 2021)
- 2024: Lawrence Jones (appointed 2024)
- 2024: Lam Shiu-kum (appointed 1997)
- 2025: Wayne O'Donnell (appointed 2025)
- 2025: Lieutenant colonel Andrew Whiddett (appointed 1988)
- 2025: Timothy Biles (appointed 2020)
- 2025: Julie Meyer (appointed 2012)
- 2025: Sean Cox (appointed 1999)
- 2025: Mike Pilavachi (appointed 2020)
- 2025: David Pickthall (appointed 2015)
- 2025: Major-General James Roddis (appointed 2016)
- 2026: Lloyd Ian Hamilton (appointed 2011)
- 2026: Graham Gilbey Trewhella (appointed 2009)
- 2026: Ian Michael Ashbolt (appointed 2015)
- 2026: Stuart William Hogg (appointed 2023)
- 2026: Angela Jane Middleton (appointed 2018)
- 2026: Nigel Timothy James O'Connor (appointed 2015)
- 2026: Paul Allen Rose (appointed 2001)
- 2026: Charles Manuel Montegriffo (appointed 2006)

== Distinguished Service Order ==
- 1911: Major William Edward O'Brien (appointed 1901)
- 1918: Major Sydney Herbert Chapin (appointed 1900)
- 1919: Lieutenant-Colonel Ludger Jules Oliver Daly-Gingras (appointed 1917)
- 1920: Lieutenant-Colonel Sydney Douglas Rumbold (appointed 1917; bar in 1919) "in consequence of his having been cashiered by sentence of a General Court-Martial." He was also stripped of CMG status
- 1920: Major John Andrew Baillie (appointed 1902) "in consequence of his having been removed from the Territorial Force on conviction by the Civil Power". Name restored 1931 under a royal warrant authorizing the restoration of certain forfeited decorations awarded for gallantry.
- 1921: Major Ewen Cameron Bruce (appointed 1920), "in consequence of his having been convicted by General Court-Martial." He was also stripped of the Military Cross. He had been convicted of robbing a creamery.
- 1922: Lieutenant-Colonel Herbert Allcard (appointed 1901), "in consequence of his having been convicted by the Civil Power." He was convicted of bigamy.
- 1936: Lieutenant-Colonel Denis Daly (appointed 1919), " in consequence of his having been convicted by General Court-Martial." He was also stripped of the Military Cross. His crime was described as "offences against men in his employ".

== Queen's / King's Police Medal ==
- 1975: Chief Superintendent of Royal Hong Kong Police Force Peter Godber (conferred 1972) – Colonial Police Medal also revoked.
- 1993: Terry Lewis (conferred 1977)
- 2017: Chief Constable of Avon and Somerset Constabulary Nick Gargan (conferred 2012) following convictions for misconduct.

== British Empire Medal ==
- 1951: Leonard Albert Smith (awarded 1947)
- 1957: Henry Alexander Tavendale (awarded 1949) following his conviction by Court-Martial and discharge from Her Majesty's Forces
- 1966: Norman Frederick Hemmings (awarded 1960)
- 1980: Frederick Thomas Jolley (awarded 1974)
- 1996: Sidney Charles Williamson Longstaffe (awarded 1989)
- 2000: Ernest Robert Donald (awarded 1985), following his conviction for sexual abuse.
- 2001: Jim Rendall (awarded 1990) following his conviction for fraud.
- 2023: Anthony Griffin (appointed 2018)
- 2024: Michael Andrea (awarded 2019)

== Imperial Service Medal ==
- 2014: William Brefni Moore following his conviction for possessing indecent images of children.

== Overseas Territories Police Medal ==
- 2026: Nicholas Pedro (awarded 2016)

== Volunteer Officers' Decoration ==
- 1896: Frederick Walter Roberts
- 1898: Captain and Honorary Major Alexander Hay, following his conviction for embezzlement.
- 1899: Lieutenant-Colonel and Honorary Colonel George Raymond Birt, following his conviction for fraud.
- 1902: Captain and Honorary Major Richard Lewis, following his conviction for embezzlement.

== Order of St John ==
=== Commander ===
- 2025: Bishop of Swansea and Brecon Anthony Pierce (appointed 2020)

=== Officer ===
- 2026: Anthony Paul French (appointed 2013)

=== Member ===
- 2014: David John Cooper (appointed 2011)
- 2017: Peter Grant Rodda (appointed 1984)
- 2026: Brian Stokes (appointed 2000)

== King's Counsel ==
- 2025: Jo Sidhu (appointed 2012)
- 2025: Anurag Mohindru (appointed 2015)
- 2016: Rohan Pershad (appointed 2010)

== See also ==
- Degradation (knighthood)
