= Peverett =

Peverett is a surname. Notable people with the surname include:

- Dave Peverett (1943–2000), English singer and musician
- Robin Peverett, English sex offender
