= A Force to Be Reckoned With =

A Force to Be Reckoned With may refer to:

- A Force to Be Reckoned With (book), 2011 book about the Women's Institute, by Jane Robinson
- A Force to Be Reckoned With (play), 2023 play about women in the police force, by Amanda Whittington for Mikron Theatre Company
- A Force to Be Reckoned With, a collected edition of Savage Dragon comics
