= Pandora's Daughters =

Pandora's Daughters may refer to:

- Pandora's Daughters. The Role and Status of Women in Greek and Roman Antiquity, 1987 book by Eva Cantarella
- Pandora's Daughters: the Secret History of Enterprising Women, 2002 book by Jane Robinson
