= Revocation =

Act of recall or annulment

Revocation is the act of recall or annulment. It is the cancelling of an act, the recalling of a grant or privilege, or the making void of some deed previously existing. A temporary revocation of a grant or privilege is called a suspension.

== Contract law ==
In the law of contracts, revocation is a type of remedy for buyers when the buyer accepts a nonconforming good from the seller. Upon receiving the nonconforming good, the buyer may choose to accept it despite the nonconformity, reject it (although this may not be allowed under the perfect tender rule and whether the Seller still has time to cure), or revoke their acceptance. Under Article 2 of the Uniform Commercial Code, for a buyer to revoke, he must show (1) the goods failed to conform to the contract and (2) it substantially impaired the value of the goods (this is a question of fact). A Proposal/Offer May be revoked at any time, before the communication of its acceptance is complete as against the proposer, but not afterward.

If the buyer knew of the nonconformity at the time of acceptance, he can revoke only if he can show he accepted the goods with the impression the seller would cure it and that did not happen. If he did not know of the nonconformity at acceptance, he can revoke only if he can prove he was reasonably induced by the difficulty of discovering the defect or by the seller's assurances. The buyer can revoke if (1) it occurs within a reasonable time after the buyer discovers or should have discovered; (2) before any substantial change in the goods not caused by their own defects; and (3) not effective until the buyer notifies the seller he is going to revoke. Upon revocation, the buyer can then cancel the contract and compel refund of the purchase price of the goods. In some states, the courts allow the seller to set off the price for the time the buyer kept the goods before the revocation.

Revocation can also refer to the termination of an offer. An offeror may revoke an offer before it has been accepted, but the revocation must be communicated to the offeree, although not necessarily by the offeror. If the offer was made to the entire world, such as in Carlill v Carbolic Smoke Ball Co, the revocation must take a form that is similar to the offer. An offer may not be revoked if it has been encapsulated in an option.

If the offer is one that leads to a unilateral contract, then unless there was an ancillary contract entered into that guaranteed that the main contract would not be withdrawn, the contract may be revoked at any time.

== Government administration ==
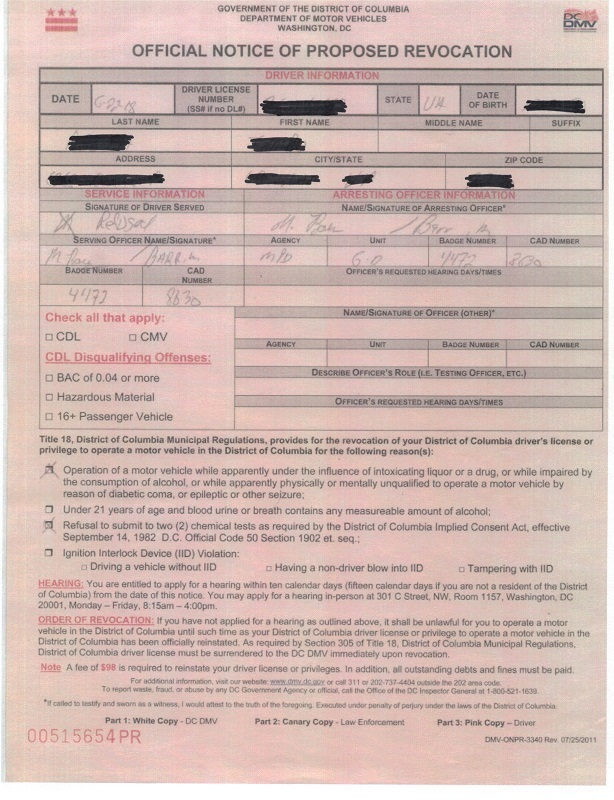
DC license revocation

There are many forms of revocation, which are typically done as either a punishment, or to prevent abuse of a privilege. When the revocation is temporary, it is called a suspension, as in a "suspended driver's license".

In criminal law, revocation of probation in the criminal justice system occurs when the subject violates the terms of probation and is incarcerated. (Release upon successful completion of the probationary term is not called revocation.)

Revocation of legal rights, privileges, or license can occur either administratively or through criminal courts. A common example is the revocation of a driver's license for egregious or repeated violations of traffic laws, which can be done by a criminal court, or an administrative traffic court, depending on jurisdiction. Another example is the loss of certain privileges in government environments that permit restrictions on normal citizen rights:

- Revocation of privileges in military service, such as a liberty pass;
- Revocation of privileges prison inmates, such as visitation rights.

A related type of revocation occurs when a person loses some form of rank or office. The demotion or removal is sometimes termed revocation.

Finally, a person can revoke a grant of representation. For example, a person may sign a power of attorney, then later revoke it. The previous grantee then loses the right make decisions on the principal's (grantor's) behalf.

== Canon law ==
In canon law, grants, laws, contracts, sentences, jurisdiction, and appointments are at times revoked by the grantor, his successor or superior according to the prescriptions of law. Revocation without just cause is illicit though often valid. Laws and customs are revoked when, owing to change of circumstances, they cease to be just and reasonable.

Concordats are revocable when they redound to the serious injury of the Catholic Church.

== See also ==
- Degradation (knighthood)
- List of revocations of appointments to orders and awarded decorations and medals of the United Kingdom
- Removal from the Order of Canada
