= Outwood Academy Easingwold =

Location
- York Road; Easingwold, North Yorkshire, YO61 3EF; England
- Coordinates: 54.11593°N 1.19000°W

Information
- Type: Academy
- Motto: Students first
- Local authority: North Yorkshire Council
- Department for Education URN: 144976 Tables
- Ofsted: Reports
- Principal: Emma Taylor
- Gender: Mixed
- Age: 11 to 18
- Enrolment: 663 as of 2023
- Capacity: 1,378
- Houses: Americas, Europe, Asia, Africa; Pre 2017: Bronte, Cook, Moore, Wilberforce and Trueman; Pre September 2010: Bulmer, Galtres, Hambleton and Westerman
- Website: easingwold.outwood.com

Outwood Academy Easingwold is a mixed 11–18 secondary school with academy status in Easingwold, North Yorkshire, England. It had 663 pupils in 2023, including an on-site sixth form.

The school is operated by Outwood Grange Academies Trust, and the current principal is Emma Taylor.

== History ==
Easingwold School was founded in 1784 by a charitable bequest of Eleanor Westerman. There seems to have been a previous school or grammar school in Easingwold, mentioned in 1564.

The school moved to its current larger site in 1954 and became a mixed, comprehensive school. The previous school site now houses Easingwold Primary School. In 1994 the Europa Block was added to the school to increase the number of classrooms available, specifically for languages. Since then a new maths block, science block and separate Sixth Form block have been added to the school grounds.

Easingwold School crest, with school motto Velle est Valere

In October 2016, Ofsted published an inspection report that found the overall effectiveness of Easingwold School to be Inadequate. The school was subsequently placed into special measures, with Headteacher Phil Benaiges removed from his post and replaced by Rob Pritchard as interim executive headteacher. In April 2017, it was announced the school would reopen as an academy in September 2017, sponsored by Outwood Grange Academies Trust.

On 1 April 2018 Easingwold School converted to academy status sponsored by Outwood Grange Academies Trust, and became Outwood Academy Easingwold.

=== Head Teachers ===
- 1951–1954, Ronald Winder
- 1955–1957, J. D. Hobkinson.
- 1958–1981, Robin Gilbert
- 1981–1993, Roger Kirk
- 1993–2000, Peter Fletcher
- 2000–2012, Carey Chidwick
- 2012 (February–August), Geoff Jenkinson (Interim)
- September 2012–October 2016, Phil Benaiges
- October 2016–July 2017, Rob Pritchard (Interim Executive Headteacher)
- August 2017 – 2023, Laura Eddery
- 2023–present, Emma Taylor

== Notable former pupils ==
- Stephen Hester, CEO of RSA Insurance Group, Former CEO of Royal Bank of Scotland
- Bobby Mimms, former professional footballer
- Jane Robinson, historian
- Kevin Hollinrake,Conservative Party Chairman and Member of Parliament
- Matthew Fisher, England Cricketer
- Tom Platt, footballer
- Taj Atwal, actress
