= Stephen Hester =

British banker (born 1960)

Sir Stephen Hester
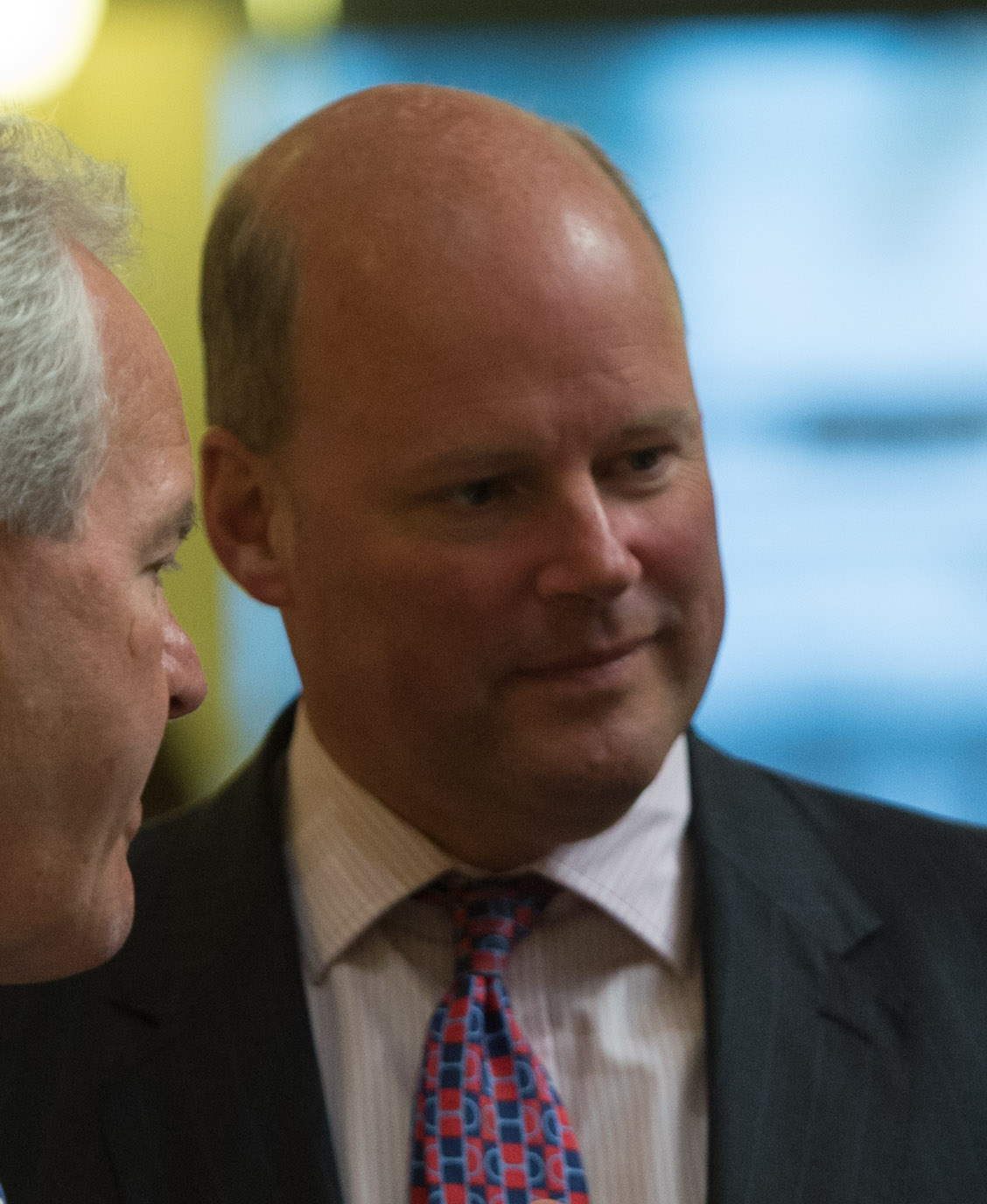
- Hester in 2014
- Born: 14 December 1960 (age 65); Yorkshire, England
- Education: Easingwold School
- Alma mater: Lady Margaret Hall, Oxford
- Occupation: Businessman
- Years active: 1982–present
- Title: Chairman, Nordea Bank and easyJet
- Spouses: Barbara Abt (m. 1991; div. 2010) Suzy Neubert (m. 2012)
- Children: 2

Sir Stephen Alan Michael Hester (born 14 December 1960) is a British business executive and banker who has been serving as chairman of Nordea Abp since 2022 and chairman of easyJet since 2021. He is also the former chief executive of RSA Insurance Group and British Land.

== Early life ==
Hester is the eldest son of Ronald, a chemistry professor at the University of York, and Dr Bridget Hester, a psychotherapist. He was born in Ithaca, NY, US but grew up primarily in the village of Crayke in North Yorkshire. He was educated at Easingwold School in North Yorkshire, a rural comprehensive school, and at Oxford where he studied at Lady Margaret Hall, and after chairing the Tory Reform Group, graduated with a first class honours degree in Philosophy, Politics and Economics.

== Career ==
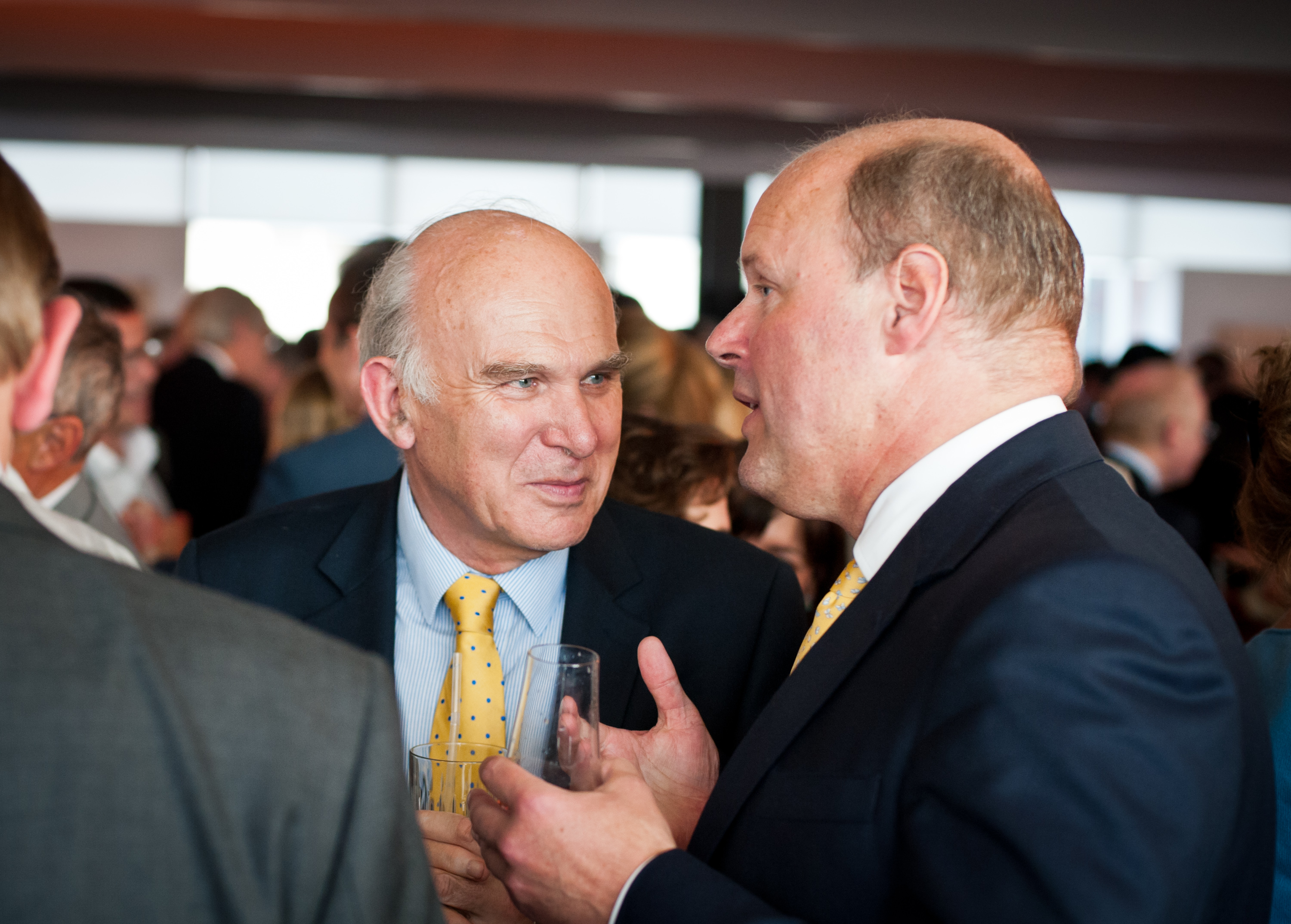
Hester (right) with Vince Cable, 2013

Hester has had an extensive business career including holding the chief executive position at three FTSE 100 companies over a 17 year period. He began his career in 1982 with investment bank Credit Suisse First Boston, where he started in corporate finance and then served a year as the chairman's assistant. He was appointed a director in 1987 and a managing director in 1988 aged 27. Following stints as co-head European M&A and investment banking, in 1996 he was appointed to the Executive Board. Hester held the position of Chief Financial Officer and Head of Support Division, until May 2000. From May 2000 to September 2001, he was Global Head of the Fixed Income Division.

In May 2002, he joined Abbey National as Finance Director. The bank had significant financial problems stemming from its wholesale and life insurance activities. As part of its significant restructuring, he was given additional responsibilities as Chief Operating Officer for the wholesale and insurance arms of the bank as well as its support functions. The restructuring was successful and in 2004 the bank was sold at a significant gain to shareholders to Santander.

In November 2004, Hester was appointed chief executive British Land succeeding Sir John Ritblat, the company’s founder.

Hester was appointed non-executive deputy chairman Northern Rock by Chancellor of the Exchequer Alistair Darling in March 2008, a role which he resigned from in September 2008 to take a non-executive position on the board of Royal Bank of Scotland.

=== Royal Bank of Scotland ===
In October 2008, RBS, then the biggest bank in the world by assets, was bailed out by UK taxpayers as part of the 2008 financial crisis. As part of that change, Hester was asked to leave British Land and replace Fred Goodwin as Chief Executive of the RBS Group.

The ensuing five years were ones of intense restructuring of RBS. Assets were reduced by some £720 billion and costs by c£4.2 billion. The task had been likened to defusing a financial bomb. In addition to restoring financial health the share price of RBS which had troughed at 90p equivalent, rose to 330p by the time he left the bank.

Hester was paid an annual salary of £1.1 million by RBS. In 2012 he was offered a bonus of just under £1 million, but following some considerable pressure from politicians and the public, he declined the bonus. Later in 2012, in June, he declined his bonus for the following year after RBS's computer problems.

In June 2013 Royal Bank of Scotland announced that Hester would be stepping down as CEO in December 2013, after five years with the bank.

=== RSA Insurance ===
On 4 February 2014, Hester joined RSA Insurance Group, the FTSE100 insurer, as CEO. The company was also experiencing a financial crisis and Hester led significant restructuring efforts, streamlining and focusing the business, raising £750 million in a rights issue and changing management whilst cutting costs. The insurer responded well to these changes with substantial increases in earnings, dividends and share price. The Company accepted an all cash bid worth £7.2 bn in June 2021 from Intact of Canada and Tryg of Denmark. The 52% premium was a record for the sector.

=== Other appointments ===
In June 2016, Hester was appointed to the board of Centrica the FTSE 100 energy Group as Senior Independent Director which he stepped down from in June 2022.

=== 2021 onwards ===
Hester joined the board of easyJet, the European airline, on 1 September 2021, becoming chair on 1 December 2021. He was appointed lead independent director of Kyndryl in November 2021. In April 2022 Hester joined the board of Nordea Bank abp as vice chair, and became chair on 1 October 2022.

== Personal life ==
Hester married Canadian-born Barbara Abt in 1991, and they have two children together. They met when both were working for Credit Suisse. They separated and divorced in 2010.

In September 2012, Hester married Suzy Neubert, a former banker and wealth manager for the fund manager J.O. Hambro. It was a second marriage for both of them. The couple have four children.

Hester bought the 400-acre (160 ha) Broughton Grange estate in Oxfordshire in 1992. One of Hester's passions is said to be development of the gardens and arboretum at the property, part of which was designed by landscape architect Tom Stuart-Smith and includes pleached limes, formal beds and five of the first Australian Wollemi pines to be brought into the UK. For nine years Hester was a trustee of the Foundation and Friends of the Royal Botanic Gardens, Kew.

Hester enjoys tennis, running and shooting, as well as skiing, for which he owns a chalet in Verbier, Switzerland. Hester also used to enjoy horse riding, as his first wife was a master of fox hounds in Warwickshire.

Hester has in the past donated to the Conservative Party. In the 2024 New Year Honours Hester was appointed Knight Bachelor for services to Business and the Economy.

Business positions
Preceded by Fred Goodwin	CEO of The Royal Bank of Scotland Group; 2008–13	Succeeded by Ross McEwan
