= Mike Blackburn (businessman) =

British banker (1941–2023)

Jeffrey Michael Blackburn (1941–2023) was a British banker who served as the chief executive officer (CEO) of the Leeds Permanent Building Society from 1987 to 1993 and of Halifax Building Society from 1993 to 1999.

== Early life and education ==
Born in Manchester, Blackburn was the eldest child of Renée and Jeffrey Blackburn, a local government official. His early years coincided with World War II, during which his family resided near Preston, Lancashire. His father served in the Royal Navy, contributing to convoy escorts to Halifax, Nova Scotia. The family eventually settled in Ipswich, where Blackburn attended Northgate Grammar School. His academic performance was hindered by poor A-level grades, leading him to work in various roles, including as a hospital porter and bus conductor.

Later in his career, Blackburn attended Henley Management College and completed an executive education course.

== Career ==
Blackburn began his professional career as a banker at Lloyds Bank. He rose through the ranks, becoming a branch manager in St Albans by age 30 and later a divisional manager.

In 1987, Blackburn became the chief executive officer (CEO) of Leeds Permanent Building Society. His time there was characterised by significant changes, including the closure of several branches and overseeing charitable initiatives.

In 1993, Blackburn was named as the CEO of the Halifax Building Society. His tenure at Halifax was marked by involvement in legal disputes, including a notable case against the UK government and the European Court of Justice concerning financial issues.

In 1999, Blackburn left Halifax and was succeeded by James Crosby. Following his departure from Halifax, Blackburn held several directorships at companies such as DFS Furniture. In 2000, he was named as the non-executive chairman of Watson Wyatt Systems and later joined ID Data. Five years later, in 2005, he joined DEBT Free Direct as a non-executive chairman as well.

Blackburn was also active as a philanthropist, notably with The Duke of Edinburgh's Award, for which he was awarded a CVO in 2009.

== Personal life ==
Blackburn was married twice. His first marriage was to Jill Firth in 1963, with whom he had two children. He married Louise Jouny in 1987, and they had two sons.
