= Ewen Cameron Bruce =

British Army officer

- Born: Ewen Cameron Bruce; 10 November 1890; Cheltenham, England
- Died: 16 April 1925 (aged 34); Cheltenham, England
- Military career
- Allegiance: United Kingdom
- Branch: British Army
- Service years: 1916–1919
- Rank: Major
- Unit: Machine Gun Corps
- Conflicts: First World War; Southern Front of the Russian Civil War; Anglo-Irish War
- Awards: Distinguished Service Order (forfeited); Military Cross (forfeited); Order of St. Vladimir (Russia); Cross of St. George (Russia); Order of the Rising Sun, 4th Class (Japan)
- Other work: The Auxiliary Division of the Royal Irish Constabulary (1920)

Ewen Cameron Bruce (10 November 1890 – 16 April 1925) was a British Army officer who served with the Heavy Branch of the Machine Gun Corps (Tank Corps from July 1917) during the First World War and the Russian Civil War. He was awarded the Military Cross for his conspicuous gallantry and devotion to duty in salvaging tanks under heavy shell fire at the Battle of Messines in July 1917 which resulted in him losing his left arm to a gunshot wound.

After the war, Bruce went to Russia and volunteered to command a British tank mission assisting the White Army under Pyotr Nikolayevich Wrangel to fight the Bolsheviks during the Russian Civil War. Bruce was awarded the Distinguished Service Order for his bravery during the June 1919 Battle of Tsaritsyn for single-handedly storming and capturing the fortified city of Tsaritsyn, now called Volgograd, under heavy shell fire in a single tank; this led to the successful capture of over 40,000 POWs.

The fall of Tsaritsyn greatly helped the White Russian Cause. Sir Basil Henry Liddell Hart stated that Bruce's actions during this battle was "one of the most remarkable feats in the whole history of the Tank Corps."

However, while serving in the Auxiliary Division during the Irish War of Independence, Bruce was arrested by Royal Military Police and court-martialled. He was ultimately convicted of masterminding the armed robbery of an estimated £75 from a creamery in Kells. His repeated appeals were unsuccessful and all past military honours were forfeited.

== Early life ==
Bruce was born in Cheltenham in 1890, the sixth and youngest son of barrister-at-law Alan Cameron Bruce-Pryce (born Bruce; 1836–1909), of Blaen-y-cwm, Monknash, Glamorganshire and his second wife, Susanna Mary Synnot née Maunsell. By his first wife, Louisa Slade (died 1868, granddaughter of Gen. Sir John Slade), his father had a further four sons, and seven daughters altogether. His father was the elder brother of Henry Bruce, 1st Baron Aberdare and Gen. Robert Bruce. He adopted the surname Bruce-Pryce in 1872 when he inherited the family estates at Monknash.

He married Eugenie Mary Alice (née Power) in 1915 and had three children; Diana Marjorie Cameron Bruce (1915–1971), Ewen Anthony Guy Cameron Bruce (1917–2002), and Eugenie Benedicta Bruce Cadbury (1921–2006; who married Peter Cadbury).

== Military career ==
Bruce served with the British Army in World War I, and was wounded five times in action during the conflict. He lost his left arm in July 1917 in France, and was gassed in 1918.

== Battle of Tsaritsyn ==
After the First World War, Bruce remained with the Tank Corps and in 1919, he volunteered to serve in South Russia during the Russian Civil War. From May 1919, Bruce commanded a combined small tank detachment that had been initially dispatched to South Russia by the War Office in a strictly non-combative role only to train the Russian White Army forces under General Pyotr Nikolayevich Wrangel that were, at that time, trying to overthrow the Bolshevik regime as part of the allied intervention in the Russian Civil War. Having been twice repulsed by the Bolsheviks with an attempted advance on Tsaritsyn, General Wrangel decided to wait for reinforcements. An infantry division was sent, and also six tanks, which on Bruce's initiative, included one of the Mark Vs which was manned by a British crew under the command of Bruce, contrary to War Office instructions that the British personnel were only to train Russians, and not to actively take part in fighting. On 26 June 1919 Wrangel was approached by Bruce directly, as commander of the British tank mission, who requested that the British tankers lead the advance On 27 June 1919, Bruce reconnoitered the front route into the city from an aeroplane of No. 47 Squadron RAF, piloted by Lt E C White, and saw that the enemy circled the city. During this flight the plane shot down an enemy observation balloon, thereby preventing the discovery of the concentration of tanks supporting the white army outside Tsaritsyn. On the same day the third advance on Tsaritsyn was launched, which opened with the advance of the tanks bursting through the wire entanglements and crossing the outer trench line, whereupon the Bolshevik regime defenders bolted. Although the Russian White Army cavalry came forward to occupy the newly conquered ground, as no additional petrol for the tanks had come up, there was a prolonged pause. The following day, on 30 June 1919, sufficient petrol was only collected to fill one of the British-manned tanks. Bruce took command of the Mark V tank and drove it into Tsaritsyn under heavy fire and captured the city from the Bolshevik Red Army. Viewed "as the most dramatic tank action in 1919" Pyotr Nikolayevich Wrangel awarded Bruce the Russian Cross of St. George and the Order of St. Vladimir for the "major role he played in the capture of Tsaritsyn".

Bruce was later awarded the Japanese Order of the Rising Sun, 4th Class for his military work in the Far East. He relinquished his commission on 12 December 1919 on account of ill health contracted whilst on active service and retained the rank of Major.

== Court-Martial in Ireland ==
Despite the loss of his left arm, Bruce was accepted into the Auxiliary Division of the Royal Irish Constabulary (ADRIC) on 3 August 1920 and was given Auxiliary No. 154 and R.I.C. No. 72351. According to historian David M. Leeson, Bruce claimed to have had a "private grudge against Sinn Féin. He was appointed Platoon Commander of No. 3 Platoon in "A" Company, which was the first Company formed while the Division was still in Quarters at the Curragh Camp, County Kildare. In September 1920, "A" Company was posted to Inistioge, County Kilkenny and shortly afterwards, an incident occurred and Bruce was accused of assaulting a civilian and forced to resign. According to Brig. General Frank Percy Crozier, the Commanding Officer of the Auxiliary Division, Bruce was dismissed as unsuitable for the Auxiliary Division, for striking a civilian without cause. However, Leeson comments that, compared with the Burning of Cork and similar atrocities being committed by Crown security forces in Ireland and which were never prosecuted, Bruce's armed robbery offence seems relatively mild, but nevertheless it still ended his military and police career and caused him to forfeit all previous medals and military honours.

In October 1920, Bruce and his nephew hired a car and drove to Thomastown, County Kilkenny, and then onto the creamery at Kells where they in the company of two soldiers, Lieutenant Cooper and Sergeant Blake of the Devonshire Regiment, robbed the creamery at gunpoint and got away with £75. Bruce was arrested by Royal Military Police in Cheltenham on 21 October and was charged with stealing £75 from the creamery. He was brought back to Ireland and tried by court martial at Waterford on 22 December. Leeson accounts in much detail in his 2011 book Black & Tans about Bruce's trial, conviction and subsequent numerous unsuccessful appeals. Leeson notes that "during the trial the creamery manager admitted that he used the safe for his own money, made unrecorded cash advances to customers, borrowed money from the till for his own use and did not know how much was there on the day of the robbery" as a result he was deemed by the judge to be an unsatisfactory witness. Leeson notes that Lieutenant Cooper testified against Bruce, stating that Bruce had organised the raid and that he went along because Bruce told him he was in the secret service; however he admitted under cross-examination that he made no such claim. Bruce was found guilty and sentence to one year in prison. His nephew was tried separately and received a sentence of three months imprisonment. Bruce was committed to Mountjoy Prison on 28 December and transferred to Liverpool on 8 August 1921 after the truce.

Bruce, however, did not take this conviction lying down. In two petitions to the crown challenging this conviction, Bruce accounted that he had asked Lieutenant Cooper to include him on any raids but he had found nothing and taken nothing. Bruce also challenged the credibility of key witnesses, and referred to his previous good character and military record: handling large sums of money in Russia and Japan with no losses. Bruce made several unsuccessful appeals against his conviction, these attempts eventually led to a bankruptcy hearing at Cheltenham in 1924. He was convicted by Court Martial on 22 December 1920 as the normal civil court system had broken down in Ireland at that time, and his MC and DSO were forfeited in July 1921.

== Death ==
Bruce died on 16 April 1925, aged 35, at Abbeyholme in Cheltenham from the effects of pneumonia.

== Relatives ==
Bruce was the paternal grandfather of Charles "Nish" Bruce.
