= Andy Hornby =

English businessman (born 1967)

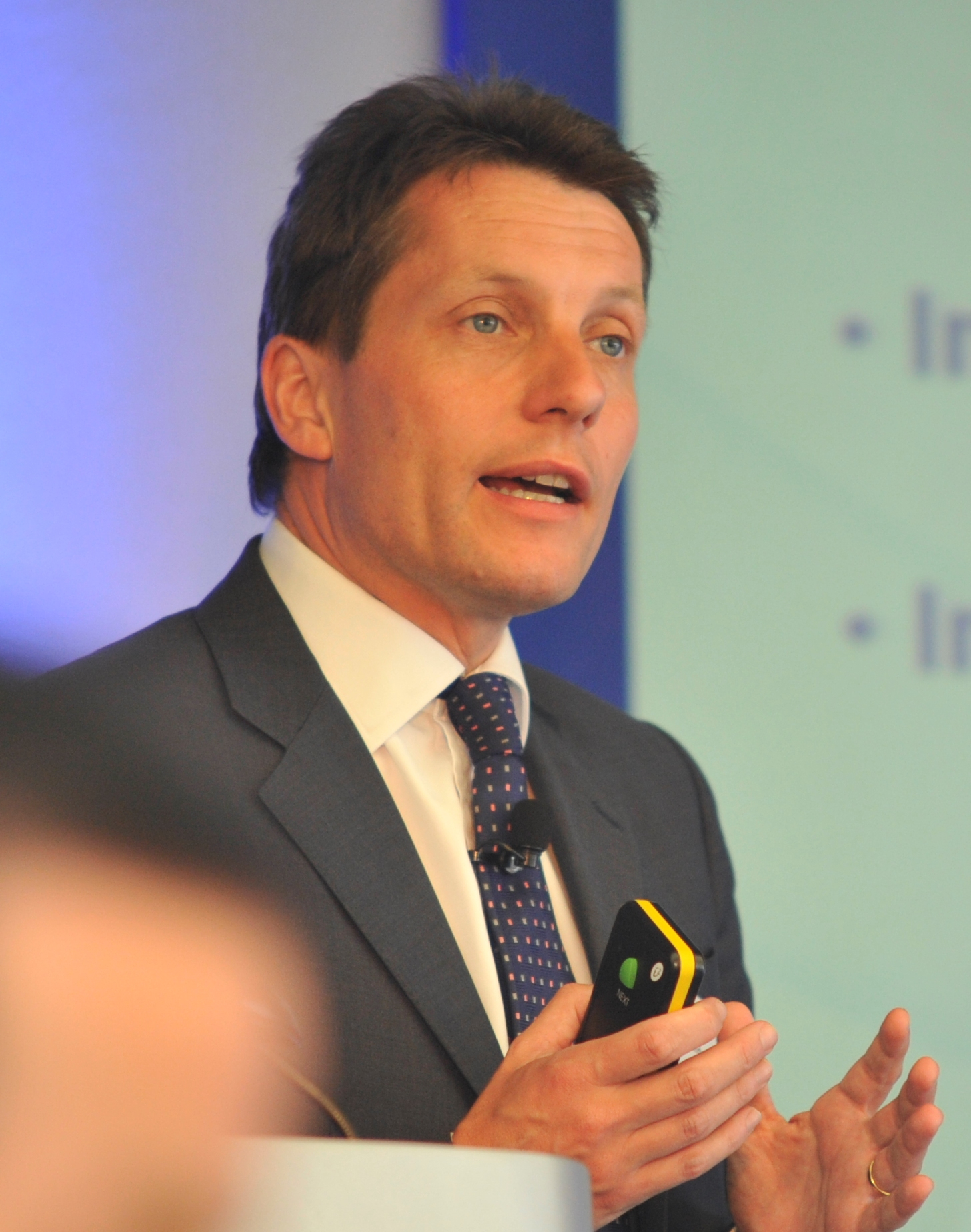
- Hornby in 2010
- Born: Andrew Hedley Hornby; 21 January 1967 (age 59); Scarborough, North Yorkshire, England
- Education: St Peter's College, Oxford; Harvard Business School
- Occupation: Businessman
- Known for: CEO HBOS plc CEO Alliance Boots; CEO Coral

Andy Hornby (born 21 January 1967) is an English businessman, chief executive of The Restaurant Group, a British chain of restaurants and public houses.

== Biography ==
Hornby was born in Scarborough, North Yorkshire, but brought up in Bristol, where his father was headteacher of Clifton College Preparatory School.

Hornby is the chief executive of The Restaurant Group (TRG). Prior to joining TRG, Hornby was the co-chief operating officer at GVC Holdings. He had previously been the COO at Ladbrokes Coral, chief executive of Coral and the chairman of Pharmacy2U. He had also been chief executive of Alliance Boots and chief executive of Halifax Bank of Scotland (HBOS). He has also held a range of roles at Asda, including retail managing director and managing director of "George" clothing. He has a degree in English literature from St Peter's College, Oxford, and an MBA from Harvard Business School, where he graduated top of his class of 800 students.

== Career ==
Hornby started his career with Boston Consulting Group where he focused on retail, consumer goods and financial sectors. After graduating from Harvard, he joined Blue Circle Industries where he carried out a range of general management roles. After leaving Blue Circle, he joined Asda under CEO Archie Norman, becoming director of corporate development, retail managing director, overseeing 36 stores and 14,000 employees; and then managing director of George whilst Allan Leighton was CEO. In 1999 he was promoted to the Asda management board at the age of 32.

In November 1999 Hornby joined Halifax as chief executive of retail and became chief executive of HBOS Retail following the merger with Bank of Scotland in 2001. In 2005 he was appointed chief operating officer of HBOS and he became Group chief executive in 2006, a position which he held until the takeover by Lloyds TSB Group. For five years Hornby was a non-executive director of Home Retail Group (& previously GUS Plc) where, until standing down in July 2009, he was also chairman of the Remuneration Committee.

On 1 July 2009, Hornby became group chief executive of Alliance Boots, an international pharmacy-led health and beauty group with over 115,000 employees and a presence in over 20 countries worldwide.

On 25 March 2011, Hornby resigned as chief executive of Alliance Boots. On 18 July 2011, he commenced his role as chief executive of Coral, which consists of a Retail estate of 1,750 betting shops, as well as an interactive business offering betting via Internet, telephone and mobile. Hornby was CEO of Coral until 2016, when he became COO of Ladbrokes Coral, following the completion of the merger between Ladbrokes and Gala Coral.

In June 2012, Hornby was appointed chairman of Pharmacy2U, an internet and mail order pharmacy. Pharmacy2U said that Hornby would continue in his position at Coral alongside the Pharmacy2U role. The business added that he would work closely with the board and management team "to refine and develop the company's strategy as it enters a period of ambitious growth". Hornby left his role as Chairman of Phamacy2U in 2017 following the sale of the majority shareholding to new private equity investors.

On 5 April 2013, The Banking Standards Commission asked financial regulators to consider whether three former HBOS bankers, including Hornby, should be barred from future roles in the financial sector. It said former bosses Sir James Crosby and Hornby were largely to blame for the collapse of HBOS, then the UK's fifth-biggest bank, in 2008; former chairman Lord Stevenson was also heavily criticised. The commission accused the trio of a "colossal failure" of management.

In 2018, Hornby became joint COO of GVC Holdings, following the acquisition of Ladbrokes Coral by GVC. Hornby left GVC in July 2019 following his appointment at The Restaurant Group. In May 2019, Hornby was appointed as the CEO of The Restaurant Group and was appointed to the Board with effect from August 2019.

=== Timeline ===
Year	Role
1988	Boston Consulting Group: Consumer Goods Consultant
1993	Blue Circle Industries: general manager
1996	Asda Roles held: Director of Corporate Development; Retail managing director; managing director of "George"
1999	Halifax: chief executive of Halifax Retail
2001	HBOS Roles held: chief operating officer – 2005; Group chief executive – 2006
2004	Home Retail Group (Formerly GUS plc) Roles held: non executive director; Chair of the remuneration committee
2009	Alliance Boots Roles held: Group chief executive
2011	Coral Roles held: chief executive
2012	Pharmacy2U Roles held: chairman
2016	Ladbrokes Coral Roles held: chief operating officer
2018	GVC Holdings Roles held: co-chief operating officer
2019	The Restaurant Group Roles held: chief executive

=== Gala Coral ===
Andy Hornby joined Gala Coral Group on 18 July 2011 as chief executive of Coral.

=== Alliance Boots ===
Hornby joined Alliance Boots on 1 July 2009 as Group chief executive. He worked in a collegiate manner under Stefano Pessina's leadership with the other members of the executive committee: Ornella Barra (chief executive, Pharmaceutical Wholesale Division, Alliance Boots), Alex Gourlay (chief executive, Health & Beauty Division, Alliance Boots), George Fairweather (Group Finance Director, Alliance Boots) and Marco Pagni (Group Legal Counsel and Chief Administrative Officer, Alliance Boots). On 25 March 2011, Alliance Boots announced that Andy Hornby was stepping down from his position. After leaving, the company paid him an additional £450,000 to prevent him from joining a competitor.

=== HBOS ===
On 1 November 1999, he joined the Halifax as chief executive of Halifax Retail. In September 2001, the bank merged with the Bank of Scotland. He became chief executive of the Retail Division of HBOS plc. He became chief operating officer (COO) in July 2005, then CEO in July 2006, taking over from James Crosby. In September 2008 he was chief executive officer of HBOS when it was near to bankruptcy. The bank agreed to be taken over by rival Lloyds TSB. After the takeover, Lloyds Banking Group stated that HBOS had made a pre-tax loss of £10.8bn in 2008. Hornby was subsequently retained on a "consultancy" contract by Lloyds Banking Group On 10 February 2009, Hornby and former HBOS chairman, Lord Stevenson of Coddenham came before the Treasury Select Committee of the House of Commons where he was questioned by MPs who complained that he refused to take any personal responsibility for his role in Halifax's collapse during the 2008 financial crisis.

=== Asda ===
Asda is a large British retail chain and a subsidiary of the American retail giant, Wal-Mart. Hornby worked for Asda from 1996 to 1999. He joined Asda as the Director of Corporate Development and later became Retail managing director and subsequently managing director of George clothing. About his time at Asda, Hornby said he had a new job every 18 months, starting in investor relations, running the stores and being the managing director of George clothing.

=== Blue Circle Industries ===
Blue Circle Industries was founded in 1900 as Associated Portland Cement Manufacturers Ltd. The company was located on the Thames estuary near London. In 2001 Blue Circle was acquired by Lafarge, which became the world's largest cement manufacturer.

=== Boston Consulting Group ===
Hornby began his career at Boston Consulting Group.

== Speaking engagements ==
On 18 May 2010 Hornby delivered the British Retail Consortium 2010 Annual Retail Lecture entitled "Retailing...what's changed with the credit crunch?" In June of the same year he gave a presentation on "Managing a business after the credit crunch" as part of the Manchester Business School's 2010 Vital Topics lecture series.

== See also ==
- James Crosby
- 2008 United Kingdom bank rescue package
