= Fred Goodwin =

Scottish banker (born 1958)

Fred Goodwin FRSE FCIBS
- Born: Frederick Anderson Goodwin; 17 August 1958 (age 68); Paisley, Renfrewshire, Scotland
- Occupations: Chartered accountant, businessman
- Years active: 1983–2010
- Title: CEO, RBS Group (2001–09)
- Spouse: Joyce McLean (m. 1990; sep. 2011)
- Children: 2

Frederick Anderson Goodwin FRSE FCIBS (born 17 August 1958) is a Scottish chartered accountant and former banker who was chief executive officer (CEO) of the Royal Bank of Scotland Group (RBS) between 2001 and 2009.

From 2000 to 2008, he presided over RBS's rapid rise to global prominence as the world's largest company by assets (£1.9 trillion), and fifth-largest bank by stock market value and its even more rapid fall as RBS was forced into effective nationalisation in 2008. On 11 October 2008, Goodwin officially announced his resignation as chief executive and an early retirement, effective from 31 January 2009 – a month before RBS announced that its 2008 loss totalled £24.1 billion, the largest annual loss in UK corporate history.

== Life and career ==
=== Early career ===
Born in Paisley, Renfrewshire, Goodwin is the son of a Scottish electrician and was the first of his family to go to university, attending Paisley Grammar School before studying law at Glasgow University.

Goodwin joined accountants Touche Ross, and qualified as a chartered accountant in 1983. Between 1985 and 1987, he was part of a Touche Ross management consultant team at Rosyth Dockyard, and became a partner in Touche Ross in 1988. He was appointed a director of Short Brothers, and tasked with preparing the largest industrial employer in Northern Ireland for its 1989 privatisation. For Touche Ross he headed the worldwide liquidation of Bank of Credit and Commerce International after its collapse in July 1991. At 32, Goodwin was in charge of 1,000 people with teams from London to Abu Dhabi and the Cayman Islands that eventually returned over half the money from one of the most complicated, high-profile financial frauds ever. The extent of his role in the liquidation of Bank of Credit and Commerce International was questioned by finance journalist Ian Fraser.

His move into banking came through his work at Touche Ross with the National Australia Bank, contributing due diligence to its 1987 takeover of Clydesdale Bank from the then Midland Bank and again with its 1995 takeover of Yorkshire Bank. During work on the latter he caught the eye of National Australia Bank executive Don Argus, and was invited to become deputy chief executive of Clydesdale in 1995, and as per his "five-second rule", accepted on the spot rising to chief executive of National Australia's British banking operations in 1996. Around this time he gained the moniker "Fred the Shred" from City financiers, reflecting a reputation for ruthlessly generating cost savings and efficiencies whilst at Clydesdale.

He joined Royal Bank of Scotland in 1998 as deputy to then-CEO Sir George Mathewson, who had ambitions to make RBS a major player rather than a national bank. RBS made waves in 2000 with its £23.6 billion takeover of NatWest, a bank three times its size. Although Goodwin's predecessor Mathewson led the deal, it was Goodwin's diligence and ability to impress investors which secured it against fierce competition from the Bank of Scotland. The Sunday Times wrote that "The NatWest deal was the making of Goodwin," with Goodwin promoted to CEO in January 2001, soon after it was secured, dedicated to continuing Mathewson's vision. Goodwin lived up to his reputation, cutting 18,000 jobs by merging parts of RBS and NatWest.

=== CEO of RBS (2001–2008) ===
==== Expansion ====
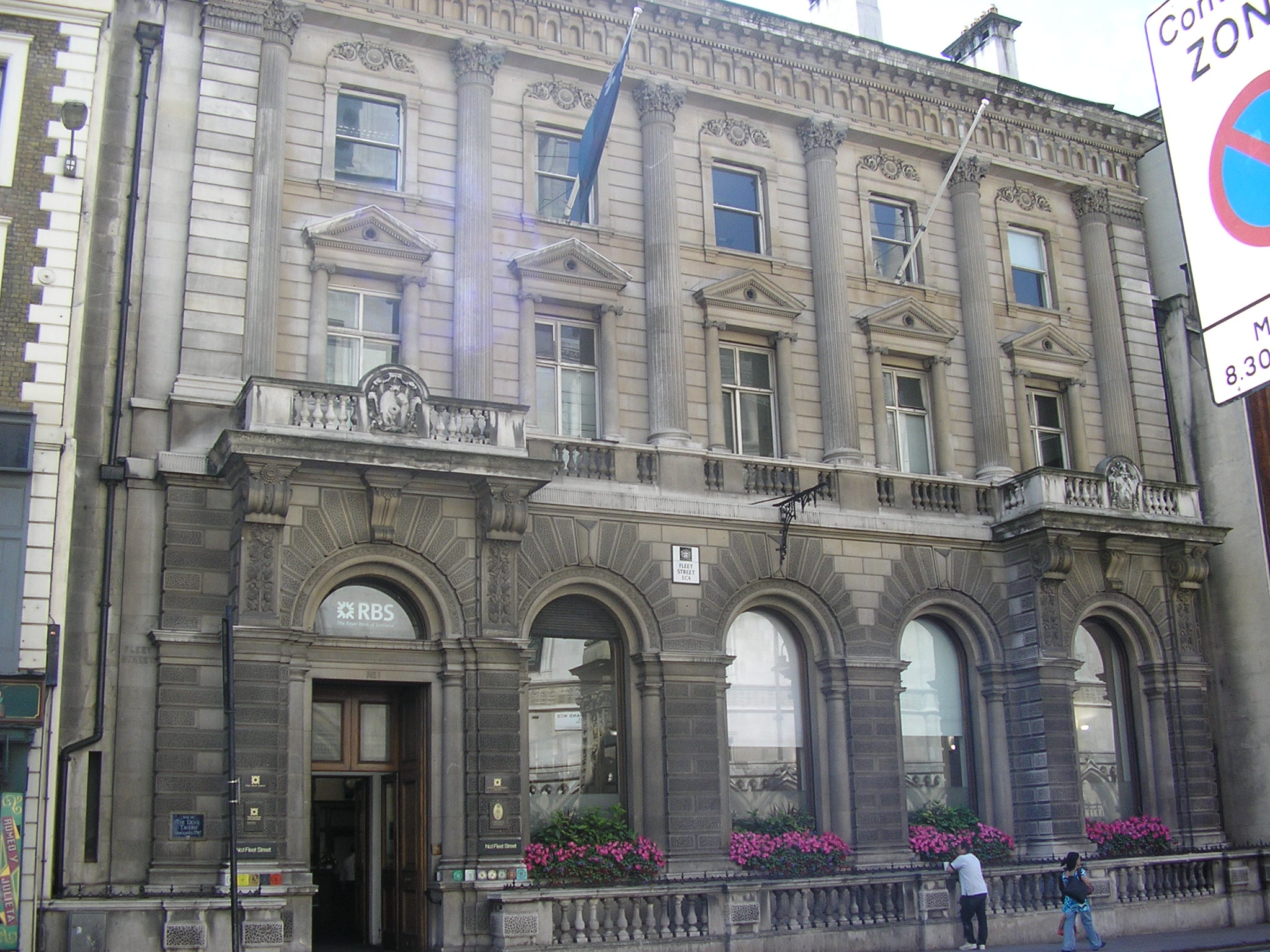
The Royal Bank of Scotland's office at 1 Fleet Street, London – trading under the historic name Child & Co.

After the purchase of NatWest, RBS made a string of further acquisitions around the world, including the purchase of Irish mortgage provider First Active and UK insurers Churchill Insurance and Direct Line. During negotiations with Credit Suisse over the acquisition of Churchill, it is said that Goodwin maintained silence for an hour at lunch with Credit Suisse's CEO, supporting his demand for indemnity against any potential losses from the associated The Accident Group, which would collapse soon after. He got his way. RBS also bulked up its US Citizens Financial Group, Inc. arm with a string of further deals. Then in May 2004, RBS said it would purchase Charter One Financial Inc. of Cleveland, Ohio for $10.5 billion. The deal, at a price "widely considered too high" spread the RBS's banking web across the Midwest for the first time, and made its U.S. banking operations No. 7 in the United States.

From the time that Goodwin took over as chief executive until 2007, RBS's assets quadrupled, its cost-to-income ratio improved markedly, and its profits soared. In 2006, pre-tax profits climbed 16% to £9.2 billion with significant growth coming from its investment banking business. By 2008 RBS was the fifth-largest bank in the world by market capitalisation. One of the factors in its rise was its enthusiasm for supporting leveraged buyouts. In 2008 it lent $9.3bn, more than double its nearest rival.

However, following investor unrest in the build-up to RBS's acquisition of a $1.6bn minority stake in Bank of China in 2005, Goodwin was criticised by some RBS shareholders for putting global expansion ahead of short-term financial returns. Between 2002 and 2005, the share price plateaued at around £17 per share, having nearly trebled between February 2000 and May 2002. Goodwin was accused of megalomania by some shareholders, as reported by Dresdner Kleinwort analyst James Eden (who said he thought the label was 'unwarranted'). Following the Bank of China deal, he was forced to promise RBS shareholders he would not indulge in any further big acquisitions and focus instead on growing the group organically.

However, in early 2007, Dutch bank ABN Amro was under pressure from hedge funds, including Chris Hohn of the hedge fund TCI, to break itself up in order to maximise shareholder value. ABN chief executive Rijkman Groenink suspected RBS of acting in concert with the hedge fund Tosca, which was chaired by former RBS Chairman Mathewson and recommended the takeover bid of an RBS consortium, against the proposed merger with Barclays Bank. Goodwin arranged a consortium of RBS, Fortis and former RBS shareholders Grupo Santander, to purchase the assets of ABN Amro and break them up in a three-way split. According to the proposed deal, RBS would take over ABN's Chicago operations, LaSalle Bank, and ABN's wholesale operations; while Santander would take the Brazilian and Italian operations, leaving Fortis with the Dutch operations. In a manoeuvre "labelled in all quarters as a poison pill" ABN Amro agreed to sell key RBS target LaSalle to Bank of America for $21bn, but in July 2007 the consortium offered the same $98bn for ABN's remaining assets, with a higher cash component (93%). The deal was struck in October 2007, just before the 2008 financial crisis, with Barclays withdrawing its EUR61bn bid and ABN's shareholders endorsing the EUR71bn RBS takeover. Coming after the nationalisation of Northern Rock due to the freezing of the wholesale money markets, the deal proved the final straw for RBS, as it severely weakened its balance sheet not only through the size of the acquisition but due to ABN Amro's substantial exposure to the US subprime mortgage crisis.

==== Collapse ====
Goodwin's strategy of aggressive expansion primarily through acquisition, including the takeover of ABN Amro, eventually proved disastrous and led to the near-collapse of RBS in the 2008 financial crisis. The €71 billion (£55 billion) ABN Amro deal (of which RBS's share was £10 billion) in particular stretched the bank's capital position – £16.8 billion of RBS's record £24.1 billion loss is attributed to writedowns relating to the takeover of ABN Amro.

It was not, however, the sole source of RBS's problems, as RBS was exposed to the liquidity crisis in a number of ways, particularly through US subsidiaries including RBS Greenwich Capital. Although the takeover of NatWest launched RBS's meteoric rise, it came with an investment bank subsidiary, Greenwich NatWest. RBS was unable to dispose of it as planned as a result of the involvement of the NatWest Three with the collapsed energy trader Enron. However the business (now RBS Greenwich Capital) started making money, and under pressure of comparison with rapidly growing competitors such as Barclays Capital, saw major expansion in 2005–7, not least in private equity loans and in the sub-prime mortgage market. It became one of the top three underwriters of collateralised debt obligations (CDOs). This increased exposure to the eventual "credit crunch" contributed to RBS's financial problems.

The third contributor to RBS's problems was its liquidity position. From a position around 2002 where the bank was essentially 'fully funded' (i.e. was funding its lending positions fully from deposits gathered from customers), the rapid growth in lending within the GBM (Global Banking and Markets) division led to a reliance on external wholesale funding. The combination of this, along with the weak equity capital position, and the massive exposure to losses on CDOs via Greenwich, were the factors that destroyed RBS. The bank experienced severe financial problems, and attempted to shore up its balance sheet with a £12 billion share issue in April 2008, one of the largest in UK corporate history. The attempt to raise an additional £7 billion capital by selling off insurers Churchill and Direct Line failed due to lack of interest in the context of the global liquidity crisis. RBS was forced in October 2008 to rely on a UK Government bank rescue package to support a shareholder recapitalisation of the bank, which resulted in the government owning a majority of the shares. Following two rights issues in 2008, Goodwin resigned as Chief Executive.

On 13 October 2008, as part of the arrangement for government support (of which Goodwin said "This isn't a negotiation, it's a drive-by shooting"), it was announced that Goodwin was to stand down as CEO, to be replaced by Stephen Hester. Goodwin formally left RBS on 1 January 2009.

The share price, when Goodwin became CEO of RBS, in January 2001, was 442p. After reaching £18 a share (equivalent to £6 per share after each share was split into three in May 2007), on the day of his departure it was announced that the share price was 65.70p reflecting share buybacks, rights issues as well as market valuation. Despite these developments, the Daily Telegraph insisted that "his grasp of finance is in the Alpha class" and that he was "unlikely to be in the growing queue of jobless bankers" for long. In 2008/9, the RBS group was effectively nationalised: the UK Government owns nearly 70% of the ordinary shares of the company owing to its enormous debts. By January 2009, the share price was more than 98% down from its February 2007 peak.

=== Media commentary and criticism ===
During Goodwin's tenure as CEO he attracted criticism for lavish spending, including expenditure on the construction of a £350 million headquarters at Gogarburn outside Edinburgh, opened by Queen Elizabeth II in 2005 (described by one commentator as "comically expensive"), and a $500m headquarters in the US begun in 2006, as well as the use of a Dassault Falcon 900 jet owned by RBS leasing subsidiary Lombard for occasional corporate travel.

Under Goodwin, "access to the RBS Executive Wing used to be extremely difficult, even for those who had enjoyed long careers at the bank". His "penthouse-style office on the top level was a staggering 20 metres long", being "so large that it has since been split in two [after Goodwin's departure) and still comfortably accommodates the bank’s current chairman Sir Howard Davies, CEO Ross McEwan and their staff". Goodwin's "hatred of mess and any form of disorder" led to the bank implementing sloping-top filing cabinets to prevent employees from placing items at the top of the cabinets.

In February 2009, RBS reported that while Goodwin was at the helm it had posted a loss of £24.1 billion, the biggest loss in UK corporate history. His responsibility for the expansion of RBS, which led to the losses, has drawn widespread criticism. During questioning by the Treasury Select Committee of the House of Commons on 10 February 2009, it emerged that Goodwin had no technical bank training and no formal banking qualifications.

In January 2009, The Guardian's City editor, Julia Finch, identified him as one of twenty-five people who were at the heart of the financial meltdown. Nick Cohen described Goodwin in The Observer as "the characteristic villain of our day", who made £20m from RBS and left the taxpayer "with an unlimited liability for the cost of cleaning up the mess". An online column by Daniel Gross labelled Goodwin "The World's Worst Banker", a phrase repeated elsewhere in the media. Gordon Prentice MP argued that his knighthood should be revoked as it is "wholly inappropriate and anomalous for someone to retain such a reward in these circumstances." A Labour MP from Scotland, Jim Sheridan, repeated the suggestion, and added that the police should investigate the activities of senior bankers.

In September 2011, Alistair Darling, the Chancellor of the Exchequer at the time of the RBS collapse, noted in leaked excerpts from his upcoming book, Back From The Brink: 1,000 Days at No 11, that Goodwin behaved "as if he was off to play a game of golf" while officials struggled to prevent a meltdown. Darling describes the secret discussions which led to the Labour government effectively nationalising RBS and Goodwin being heavily criticised for his management style and conduct and wrote that Goodwin "deserved to be a pariah".

==== Size of pension ====
Media and government criticism increased on disclosure in February 2009 of the size of Goodwin's pension. The treasury minister Lord Myners had indicated to RBS that there should be "no reward for failure", but Goodwin's pension entitlement, represented by a notional fund of £8 million, was doubled, to a notional fund of £16 million or more, because under the terms of the scheme he was entitled to receive, at age 50, benefits which would otherwise have been available to him only if he had worked until age 60.

Sir Philip Hampton, RBS's new chairman, stated that as a result Goodwin is drawing £693,000 a year (later revised to £703,000 due to Goodwin working an extra month in the new financial year), and disclosed that under the RBS pension scheme Goodwin is entitled to draw the pension already, at age 50, because he had been asked to leave employment early, rather than having been dismissed. A pensions expert suggested that this meant Goodwin had received a substantial payoff from his early retirement, as it would cost around £25 million to buy such a pension and his pension 'pot' amounted to £16 million. When the matter became public in late February 2009, Goodwin defended his decision to refuse to reduce his pension entitlement in a letter to Lord Myners on 26 February, pointing out that on leaving in October 2008 he had given up a contractual 12-month notice period worth around £1.29 million and share options worth around £300,000. In March 2009 Lord Myners revealed that part of the reason Goodwin's pension was so large was that RBS treated him as having joined the pension scheme from age 20 (instead of 40, when he actually joined) and ignored contributions to his pension from previous employment.

Stephen Timms, a government finance minister, protested publicly about the matter. He said that it would be referred to the UK Financial Investments Limited. The Chancellor, Alistair Darling, ordered lawyers to explore legal avenues to recover the money, – though the legal options appear to be limited – and Prime Minister Gordon Brown declared that "a very substantial part of it [Goodwin's pension] should be returned." Former deputy PM John Prescott called on the government to withdraw Goodwin's pension and tell Goodwin to "sue if you dare." Liberal Democrats Treasury spokesman Vince Cable said that "What the government could do is say that if the company had gone bust, which it would have had it not been a bank, he would have been entitled to a compassionate payout of £27,000 a year, and if he does not like that he could sue." Cable added that Goodwin "obviously has got no sense of shame."

In evidence to the Treasury Select Committee on 3 March 2009, John Kingman, CEO of UK Financial Investments Ltd, the company set up to manage the government's holdings in banks, directly blamed the Royal Bank of Scotland board for awarding its former CEO a discretionary pension. Kingman said that the government was aware of the size of the pension pot in October 2008 (before UKFI was established), but that "what the government was not told was that this payment was in any way discretionary". He accused the RBS board of not sharing material facts with Financial Services Secretary Lord Myners. RBS could have terminated Mr Goodwin's contract as CEO with 12 months' notice, so avoiding the more expensive pension award. Kingman told the committee that UKFI was investigating whether RBS had "full knowledge of the alternatives" when it granted Mr Goodwin his pension. A letter from RBS setting out the background to the October 2008 decision on Goodwin's employment termination, the corporate approval process of the pension award and HM Treasury involvement was submitted to the Treasury Select Committee. Had he been dismissed instead of accepting early retirement, his annual pension would have been £416,000, payable from age 60. If the government had not stopped RBS from going bankrupt, his pension would have been paid out of the pension-protection fund and been £28,000 a year, starting at age 65.

His home in The Grange in Edinburgh was vandalised on 25 March 2009 by an anti-banking group apparently known as "Bank Bosses Are Criminals", according to a newspaper who were sent details of the attack by the group. In their message, they said

Fred Goodwin's house in Edinburgh was attacked this morning. We are angry that rich people, like him, are paying themselves a huge amount of money and living in luxury, while ordinary people are made unemployed, destitute and homeless. Bank bosses should be jailed. This is just the beginning.

Several windows in his house were smashed, and a car damaged in the drive below.

On 18 June 2009, RBS stated that following negotiation an agreement was reached between RBS and Goodwin to reduce his pension to £342,500 a year from the £555,000 set in February after he took out an estimated £2.7 million tax-free lump sum. The agreement followed the completion of RBS's internal inquiry into Goodwin's conduct, which found no wrongdoing. In May 2024, it was reported that RBS was spending about £598,000 a year, adjusting for inflation, on Goodwin’s pension.

==== Superinjunction ====
On 10 March 2011, John Hemming, a backbench Liberal Democrat MP, referred in Parliament (under parliamentary privilege) to the supposed existence of "a superinjunction preventing [Goodwin] from being identified as a banker". As matters discussed in Parliament can be freely reported by the press, newspapers including The Guardian, The Independent, and The Daily Telegraph, reported that Goodwin had obtained such an injunction, while still remaining unable to explain what information the injunction restricted the publication of.

On 19 May 2011, Lord Stoneham, speaking in the House of Lords, asked the Government "how can it be right for a super-injunction to hide the alleged relationship between Sir Fred Goodwin and a senior colleague?" Later that day, the High Court varied the order, allowing Goodwin's name to be published, but continued it in relation to the identity of the lady involved. In his judgment, Mr Justice Tugendhat noted that the order had not been a superinjunction as it had been published in anonymised form on the British and Irish Legal Information Institute website. He also stated that the injunction had not prevented Goodwin being identified as a banker, but instead prevented the person applying for the injunction from being identified as a banker, and that this was done because "if the applicant were identified as a banker that would be likely to lead to his being named, which would defeat the purpose of granting him anonymity". The judge criticised press reporting of the case as including "misleading and inaccurate statements".

=== Other activities ===
Goodwin has chaired various government task forces including one examining the work of credit unions and the New Deal programme. He is a former president of the Chartered Institute of Bankers in Scotland. Goodwin became chairman of The Prince's Trust in 2003. It was announced in January 2009 that his tenure would not be renewed for another three-year term, which he left in June 2009.

In January 2009, it was rumoured that Goodwin was being considered as a replacement for Max Mosley as President of the FIA (Formula One's governing body) as Mosley was due to step down in 2009. Goodwin, a motoring enthusiast, had been "instrumental" in RBS's sponsorship deal with the Williams Formula One team. In February 2009, RBS announced that the £10 million-a-year deal, struck in 2005, would end in 2010, as part of a strategic review of all sponsorship activity.

From January 2010, he was employed as a senior adviser to RMJM, an international architecture firm. He left the position after less than a year.

== Personal life ==
One of Goodwin's hobbies is restoring classic cars – the first, a Standard 8, bought from the proceeds of a summer job. He is also a keen golfer and Formula One racing fan. Other pastimes have included annual shooting trips to Spain with Santander chairman Emilio Botín.

In August 2011, Goodwin moved out of the family home in Colinton after being asked to leave by his wife and returned to their house in The Grange. The move followed media reports of Goodwin's extra-marital affair with a colleague at the Royal Bank of Scotland, after which Goodwin filed a super-injunction to protect the identity of his former mistress.

== Honours ==
Goodwin was knighted in the 2004 Birthday Honours for his services to the banking industry. However, on 1 February 2012, Goodwin's knighthood was "cancelled and annulled" by the Queen on the advice of Her Majesty's Government and the Honours Forfeiture Committee. A Cabinet Office spokesman said:

The scale and severity of the impact of his actions as CEO of RBS made this an exceptional case. Both the Financial Services Authority and the Treasury Select Committee have investigated the reasons for this failure and its consequences. They are clear that the failure of RBS played an important role in the 2008 financial crisis, which, together with other macroeconomic factors, triggered the worst recession in the UK since the Second World War and imposed significant direct costs on British taxpayers and businesses. Fred Goodwin was the dominant decision-maker at RBS at the time. In reaching this decision, it was recognised that widespread concern about Fred Goodwin's decisions meant that the retention of a knighthood for 'services to banking' could not be sustained.

The annulment proved controversial amongst political and business figures, who pointed out the three-and-a-half-year gap since the near-collapse of RBS, and the coincidence of the referral taking place during a political argument over bonus payments to the current head of the bank. Alistair Darling described the annulment as having appeared to have been taken "on a whim", whilst the Institute of Directors warned against creating "anti-business hysteria". Darling declared "There is something tawdry about the government directing its fire at Fred Goodwin alone; if it’s right to annul his knighthood, what about the honours of others who were involved in RBS and HBOS?” In addition, the Queen and Prince Charles were sympathetic to Goodwin and concerned about the implications of the annulment, as Goodwin had been a good custodian of their charities and served quietly after his departure from RBS.

Other awards received by Goodwin include:

- December 2002 – Forbes (global edition) "Businessman of the Year", which described him as an original thinker with a fast-forward frame of mind who had transformed RBS from a nonentity into a global name
- 2003 – 2006 – No.1 in Scotland on Sunday's Power 100
- December 2003 – "European Banker of the Year" in 2003
- June 2004 – awarded an honorary doctor of Laws by the University of St Andrews
- July 2008 – awarded an honorary fellowship by the London Business School

== See also ==
- 2008 United Kingdom bank rescue package
- Tom McKillop
- UK Financial Investments
- 2011 British privacy injunctions controversy
- List of revocations of appointments to orders and awarded decorations and medals of the United Kingdom

Business positions
Preceded by Sir George Mathewson	Chief Executive Officer of the Royal Bank of Scotland Group; January 2001 – November 2008	Succeeded by Stephen Hester
