= Dennis Stevenson, Baron Stevenson of Coddenham =

British businessman (born 1945)

The Right Honourable The Lord Stevenson of Coddenham CBE
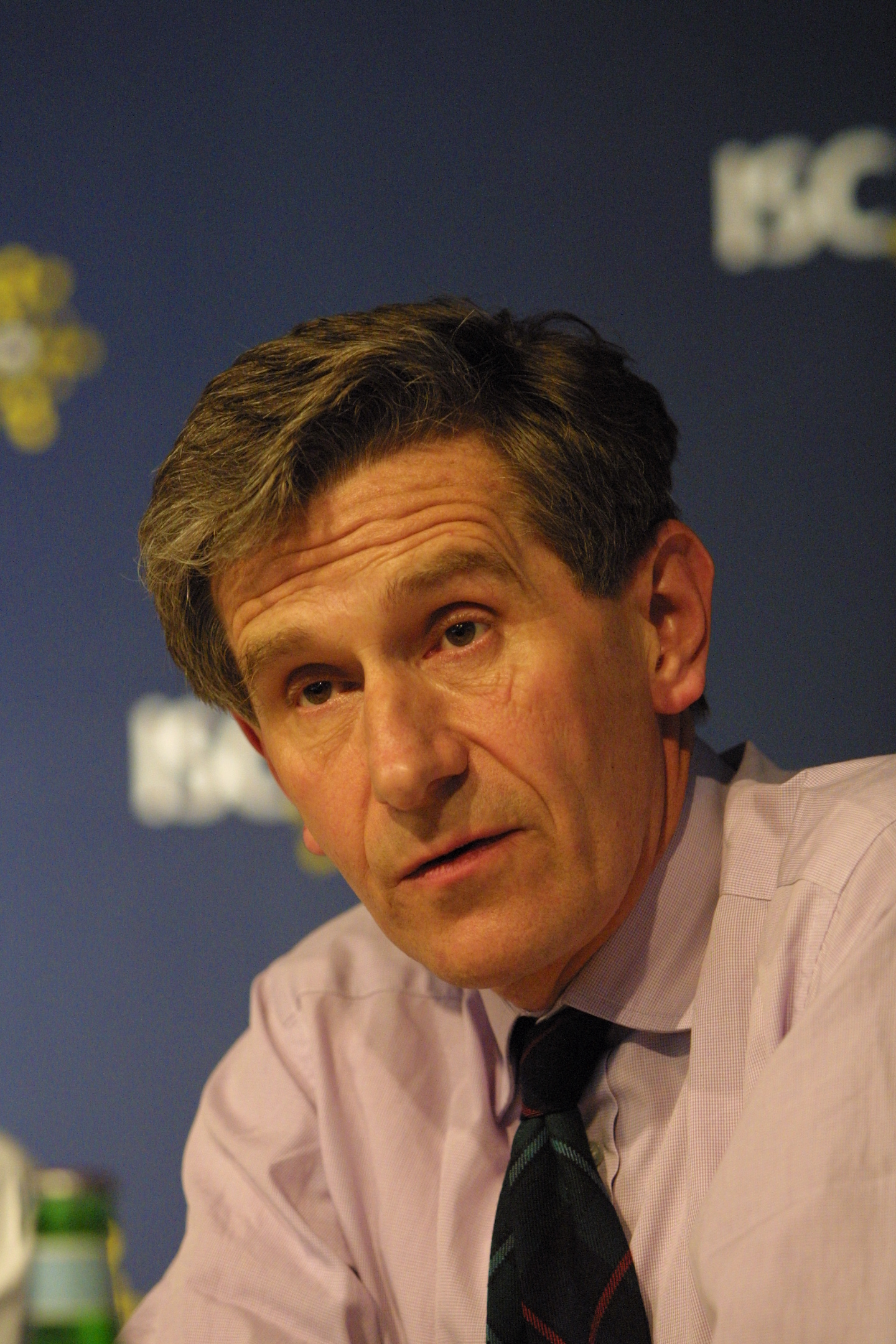
- Stevenson in 2002

Member of the House of Lords
- Lord Temporal
- Life peerage 13 July 1999 – 1 October 2023

Personal details
- Born: Henry Dennistoun Stevenson; 19 July 1945 (age 81)
- Spouse: Charlotte Susan Vanneck (m. 1972)
- Relations: Sir Peter Vanneck (father-in-law)
- Children: 4
- Education: Edinburgh Academy; Trinity College, Glenalmond; King's College, University of Cambridge
- Known for: former chairman of HBOS
- Boards served on: British Technology Group (1979–1989); Tyne Tees Television (1982–87); Manpower Inc. (1988–2006); Thames Television (1991–1993); J. Rothschild Assurance plc (1991–1997); English Partnerships (1993–2004); BSkyB (1994–2001); Lazard Bros (1997–2002); St James's Place Capital (1997–2002); Waterstones (2011–2016)

Henry Dennistoun "Dennis" Stevenson, Baron Stevenson of Coddenham (born 19 July 1945) is a British businessman and former chairman of HBOS. He sat on the crossbenches in the House of Lords from 1999 until his retirement in 2023.

== Early life and education ==
Stevenson was born on 19 July 1945 to Sylvia Florence (née Ingleby) and Alexander James Stevenson. He was educated at two Scottish independent schools: Edinburgh Academy and Trinity College, Glenalmond (since renamed Glenalmond College). He then attended King's College, Cambridge.

== Career ==
Stevenson's business career started when he set up the SRU Consultancy Group upon leaving Cambridge. He was Chairman of the Newton Aycliffe and Peterlee New Town Development Corporation from 1971 to 1980.

Stevenson was a non-executive Director of British Technology Group (1979–1989), Tyne Tees Television (1982–1987), Manpower Inc. (1988–2006), Thames Television (1991–1993), J. Rothschild Assurance plc (1991–1997), English Partnerships (1993–2004), BSkyB (1994–2001), Lazard Bros (1997–2002), St James's Place Capital (1997–2002), and Waterstones (2011–2016).

He was Chairman of the National Association of Youth Clubs (1973-1981), Intermediate Technology Development Group (1983–1990), the Trustees of the Tate Gallery (1988–1998), Aerfi (formerly GPA, 1993–1999), Pearson (1997–2005), HBOS (formerly Halifax Plc, 1999–2008), the House of Lords Appointments Commission (2001–2008), and Aldeburgh Music (2002–2012).

He was formerly Chancellor of University of the Arts London.

Stevenson is a long time campaigner for greater understanding and treatment of mental illness informed by his own experiences of depression. He was the Founding Chair of MQ: Transforming Mental Health, a charity, which supports research into mental health; and he promoted a Private Members' Bill – the "Mental Health (Discrimination) Bill" – the first key step in the UK to removing a number of the key discriminations against people who suffer from mental illness.

He is currently a trustee of Inter Mediate, which facilitates negotiation to help bring a sustainable peace in the most difficult, complex and dangerous conflicts where other organisations are unable to operate.

== Personal life ==
Stevenson married Charlotte Susan Vanneck, daughter of Sir Peter Vanneck, a former Lord Mayor of London, in 1972 and has four sons. He was appointed a Commander of the Order of the British Empire (CBE) in the 1981 New Year Honours, knighted in the 1998 New Year Honours, and created a life peer on 13 July 1999 taking the title Baron Stevenson of Coddenham, of Coddenham in the County of Suffolk. He retired from the House of Lords on 1 October 2023.

== Credit crunch ==
Stevenson became chairman of Halifax plc in 1999 and when they merged with Bank of Scotland in May 2001 he became chairman of the merged group, HBOS plc. After the collapse of Lehman Brothers in September 2008 and the subsequent forced rescue-merger between HBOS and Lloyds TSB, Stevenson and Andy Hornby resigned, waiving their rights to any "pay-offs". At a meeting of the Treasury Select Committee of the House of Commons on 10 February 2009, Stevenson apologised for the near-collapse of HBOS. In April 2013, the Parliamentary Commission on Banking Standards assigned the primary responsibility for the collapse of HBOS to Stevenson along with former chief executives Sir James Crosby and Andy Hornby. The commission urged the regulator to ban all three men from the industry. Their report said: "Lord Stevenson has shown himself incapable of facing the realities of what placed the bank in jeopardy from that time until now". And: "The corporate governance of HBOS at board level serves as a model for the future, but not in the way in which Lord Stevenson and other board members appear to see it. It represents a model of self-delusion, of the triumph of process over purpose". (Parliament's Banking Standards Commission report, issued in April 2013)

== Arms ==
Coat of arms of Dennis Stevenson, Baron Stevenson of Coddenham
Crest A dexter hand holding a laurel wreath Proper. Escutcheon Argent a chevron Azure between three falcons' heads erased Gules. Motto Coelum Non Solum (Heaven Not Earth)

New title	Chairman of the House of Lords Appointments Commission; 2000–2008	Succeeded by The Lord Jay of Ewelme
Orders of precedence in the United Kingdom
Preceded by The Lord Patel	Gentlemen; Baron Stevenson of Coddenham	Followed by The Lord Forsyth of Drumlean
