= James Crosby (banker) =

British businessman

James Robert Crosby (born 14 March 1956) is an English banker. He was Deputy Chairman of the Financial Services Authority from January 2004 until he resigned on 11 February 2006. He had previously been the chief executive of Halifax Bank until its merger with Bank of Scotland to form HBOS, of which he was Chief Executive until 2006. On 3 December 2012, Crosby was required to appear before Britain's Parliamentary Commission on Banking Standards.

Crosby was knighted for services to the financial industry in 2006, but requested that the honour be rescinded in 2013 following the official report into the collapse of HBOS. His request was accepted and his knighthood was formally annulled on 11 June 2013.

== Early life ==
Crosby was born in Leeds. He was educated at the Lancaster Royal Grammar School between 1967 and 1974. After leaving the school, he continued his studies in mathematics at Brasenose College, Oxford.

== Early career ==
Crosby joined financial services company Scottish Amicable Life Assurance (acquired in 1997 by Prudential plc) in 1977. After qualifying as a Fellow of the Faculty of Actuaries in 1980, he was a founding director of J Rothschild Assurance in 1991, which went on to become wealth manager St. James's Place plc.

== HBOS ==
Crosby joined the Halifax bank in 1994 as Managing Director of Halifax Life. Five years later, he became the chief executive of Halifax plc, replacing Mike Blackburn, and in 2001 Crosby became the first chief executive of the newly formed HBOS Group after overseeing the merger between Halifax plc and the Bank of Scotland. In early 2006 Crosby retired after seven years as chief executive leaving HBOS as the fourth largest bank in the United Kingdom in terms of market capitalisation. His position was taken by "his young protégé" Andy Hornby in July 2006. In April 2013, the Parliamentary Commission on Banking Standards assigned some responsibility for the collapse of HBOS to Crosby, along with primary responsibility to Dennis Stevenson and Andy Hornby.

== Financial Services Authority ==
Crosby was appointed in January 2004 by HM Treasury as a non-Executive Director of the Financial Services Authority whilst still CEO of HBOS. In November 2007 he became Deputy Chair of the FSA, and in February 2009 he resigned this role.

During a session of the Treasury Select Committee of the House of Commons on 10 February 2009, it was alleged that Sir James had ignored warnings by its former head of Group Regulatory Risk, Paul Moore, relating to risky business practices. Moore had predicted that HBOS's rapid growth left it vulnerable to a large number of borrower defaults. In 2005 the whistleblower Moore was sacked by Crosby, with Moore quoted as saying that Crosby wrote "The decision (to sack Moore) was mine and mine alone." Moore related the key issues in his statement:

2.12 When I was Head of Group Regulatory Risk at HBOS, I certainly knew that the bank was going too fast (and told them), had a cultural indisposition to challenge (and told them) and was a serious risk to financial stability (what the FSA call "Maintaining Market Confidence") and consumer protection (and told them).

2.13 I told the Board they ought to slow down but was prevented from having this properly minuted by the CFO. I told them that their sales culture was significantly out of balance with their systems and controls.

2.14 I was told by the FSA, the Chairman of the Audit Committee and others that I was doing a good job.

2.15 Notwithstanding this I was dismissed by the CEO (he wrote that it was "...his decision and his alone"). I sued HBOS for unfair dismissal under the whistle blowing legislation. Ironically, I was also the "Good Practice Manager" for whistle blowing purposes at HBOS but could hardly report my case to myself!

On 11 February 2009 Crosby resigned from his post at the Financial Services Authority, which BBC News Business Editor Robert Peston says he understood was to protect the FSA from controversy. The FSA released a statement late on 11 February 2009 that it had concerns about HBOS before the Moore resignation, a statement which raises yet more questions about the regulation of HBOS. A central problem concerns conflict of interests between board members of the FSA and the companies it is trying to regulate. However, Moore has received support from a former member of his team at HBOS, Anthony Smith, who on 17 February 2009, accused HBOS of "dumbing down".

Crosby was further criticised when, following the takeover of HBOS by Lloyds, HBOS was responsible for annual losses of £10 billion, in part due to write-downs made because Lloyds' accounting standards are much more conservative than those of HBOS. Conservative Shadow Chancellor George Osborne said that the government's bank bailout money had been wiped out by the HBOS losses, saying that "HBOS bankers like James Crosby bear a heavy responsibility".

== Links with HM Treasury ==
On 11 July 2006, Crosby was appointed by the then Chancellor of the Exchequer, Gordon Brown, to lead the Government's Public Private Forum on Identity Management, a scheme designed to counter problems such as identity fraud. In the 2006 Birthday Honours Crosby received a knighthood for services to the financial industry.

In April 2008, Crosby was appointed by Chancellor Alistair Darling to head up a Working Group of mortgage industry experts to advise the Government on how to improve the functioning of the mortgage market.

== Other roles ==
In 2006, Crosby was appointed to lead Gordon Brown's Identity Assurance review.

Crosby was a non-executive director of television company ITV, and a trustee of charity Cancer Research UK.

== Parliamentary Commission on Banking Standards ==
On 3 December 2012 Crosby was required to appear before the British Parliamentary Commission on Banking Standards over his role as Chief Executive during the Collapse of HBOS.

Britain's Financial Times reported:

Sir James was evasive on whether he would consider giving up his knighthood, saying that it was a 'huge honour' at the time but added: 'I am in no doubt that my reputation and achievement will never again be seen in the same light.'

Fred Goodwin, former chief executive of Royal Bank of Scotland, was stripped of his knighthood this year. The former HBOS manager also said he did not think he would be granted permission to run a bank again. His successor Andy Hornby, who was at the helm of HBOS when it nearly collapsed in 2008, reiterated in a separate testimony at the commission his 'heartfelt apologies for what had happened at HBOS'. The two former chief executives' grilling came as Andy Haldane, the Bank of England's executive director in charge of financial stability, said the impact of the banking crisis was 'as bad as a world war'.

'If we are fortunate, the cost of the crisis will be paid for by our children. More likely it will still be being paid for by our grandchildren,' he told BBC Radio 4. 'There is every reason why the general public ought to be deeply upset by what has happened – and angry.'

'Whitehall's honours forfeiture committee met in recent days and accepted Mr Crosby's request for him to lose his knighthood.'

== See also ==
- Andy Hornby
- 2008 United Kingdom bank rescue package
