= Jane Robinson (historian) =

British historian (born 1959)

- Born: 1959 (age 66–67); Edinburgh
- Education: Somerville College, Oxford
- Occupation: Historian

Jane Robinson (born 1959) is a British social historian specialising in women's history. She has published on female pioneers in a range of fields including education, travel, and the professions, and on other women's social history topics including suffrage, illegitimacy, and the Women's Institute.

== Life ==
She was born in Edinburgh, educated at Easingwold School and Somerville College, Oxford, worked in the antiquarian book trade for 10 years and now lives near Oxford writing and lecturing.

== Research and writings ==
In 1994, she published an anthology of women travellers' writings, Unsuitable for Ladies. Her 2002 work Pandora's Daughters (Women Out of Bounds in the United States) discussed "Enterprising women" including early French writer Christine de Pizan, criminal Moll Cutpurse, and Christian Cavanagh who joined the army in male disguise. In 2005 she wrote Mary Seacole, a biography of the nurse who was in 2004 voted "the top black Briton of all time", and her 2009 book Bluestockings describes women's entry into English universities from the 1860s to 1939, and was the BBC Radio 4 Book of the Week.

In 2011 Robinson published A Force to be Reckoned With, a history of the Women's Institute; she says in the introduction that "the WI members I've come across - past as well as present - have had more humour, courage, spirit, eccentricity and common sense than any other individuals I've ever written about. And that's saying something."

In 2015 she published In the Family Way: Illegitimacy Between the Great War and the Swinging Sixties, a book on attitudes to illegitimacy, described in The Telegraph as "bone-chilling".

Her 2018 book Hearts And Minds: The Untold Story of the Great Pilgrimage and How Women Won the Vote tells the story of the Suffragists, who campaigned for women's suffrage in Britain separately from the Suffragettes and marched on London in 1913.

Her 2020 book Ladies Can’t Climb Ladders - The Pioneering Adventures of the First Professional Women explores the lives of pioneering women forging careers in the fields of medicine, law, academia, architecture, engineering and the church in the period following the passing of the Sex Disqualification (Removal) Act 1919.

== Publications ==
- Wayward Women: a Guide to Women Travellers (1990, Oxford UP, ISBN 0192828223)
- Unsuitable for Ladies: an Anthology of Women Travellers (1994, Oxford UP, ISBN 0192116819)
- Angels of Albion : Women of the Indian Mutiny (1996, Viking, ISBN 0670846708)
- Parrot Pie for Breakfast : an Anthology of Women Pioneers (1999, Oxford UP, ISBN 0192880209)
- Pandora's Daughters: the Secret History of Enterprising Women (2002, Constable, ISBN 0094805105)

- Published in USA as Women Out of Bounds: the Secret History of Enterprising Women (2003, Carroll & Graf, ISBN 0786710519)

- Mary Seacole: The Charismatic Black Nurse Who Became a Heroine of the Crimea (2005, Constable, ISBN 9781845294977)
- Bluestockings : the Remarkable Story of the First Women to Fight for an Education (2009, Viking, ISBN 9780141029719)
- A Force to be Reckoned With: A History of the Women's Institute (2011, Virago, ISBN 9781844086597)
- In the Family Way: Illegitimacy Between the Great War and the Swinging Sixties (2015, Viking, ISBN 978-0670922062)
- Hearts And Minds: The Untold Story of the Great Pilgrimage and How Women Won the Vote (2018, Doubleday, ISBN 978-0857523914)
- Ladies Can’t Climb Ladders - The Pioneering Adventures of the First Professional Women (2020, Doubleday, ISBN 9780857525871)
