= Robin Peverett =

Robin David Peverett was a 'House parent' at Pestalozzi Children's Village before becoming a 'housemaster' at DCPS Coursehorn in 1963, and later headmaster of Dulwich College Preparatory School (near Cranbrook, Kent) from circa 1967 to 1990.

Peverett was promoted from Cadet to Second Lieutenant with effect from 30 May 1953 for the Royal Sussex Regiment.

He was appointed to be an Officer of the Civil Division of the Most Excellent Order of the British Empire (OBE) on 30 December 1995 for services to education. He was, at that time, Director of Education, Incorporated, Association of Preparatory Schools.

== Sentence ==
He was sentenced by the Maidstone Crown Court in 2000 to 18 months in prison suspended for two years, after admitting nine charges of indecently assaulting seven pupils (six girls and one boy, between the ages of 10 and 13) in the late 1960s/1970s.

After lengthy legal wrangling and plea-bargaining he pleaded guilty and was allowed to walk free. Judge David Griffiths said, a serious breach of trust which would normally warrant a custodial sentence, but due to Peverett's accomplishments - there were glowing testimonies from former pupils, staff, parents, fellow heads and even one ex-cabinet minister - his was an exceptional case. He was stripped of his OBE appointment following his conviction.

In 2003 another male victim came forward but CPS declined to take up the case. 2014: A further male victim filed a complaint in 2014 with Kent Police who indicated that they were aware of two other male victims who were not part of the original criminal and civil cases. Again due to the elapsed time and a lack of sufficient corroborating evidence, CPS declined to take up the case.

As of 2017 the civil case in Central London County Court against Robin Peverett and Dulwich Preparatory School continues.
