= Bank of London =

Bank of London or London Bank may refer to:

- Bank of London (clearing bank), established 2021
- Central Bank of London (1863–1891)
- Chartered Bank of London (1853–1969)
- Union Bank of London (1839–1918)
- London Savings Bank (1916–1971)
- London and Westminster Bank (1834–1923, thereafter Westminster Bank) and others merged into it:
  - Commercial Bank of London, merged 1861
  - Bank of London (1855–1866), merged Consolidated Bank 1866, merged Parr's Bank 1896, merged 1918
  - London and County Bank, merged 1909 to form London County and Westminster Bank
- London Bank, Coppa d'Oro di Milano 2001 winning racehorse

== See also ==
- Bank of London and the Middle East, established 2006
- Bank of London and South America {1923–1971}
- Bank of London and Montreal {1958–1984}
- Banco de Londres y Río de la Plata {1862–1923}
- Delhi and London Bank (1865–1916)
- London Bank of Australia {1893–1921}
- London and Provincial Bank {1870–1918}
- London Scottish Bank (closed 2009)
- Bank of England, UK central bank based in London
- Bank London Underground station
- Category:Banks based in the City of London
