= International Westminster Bank =

Subsidiary of National Westminster Bank which existed from 1913 to 1989

International Westminster Bank Plc
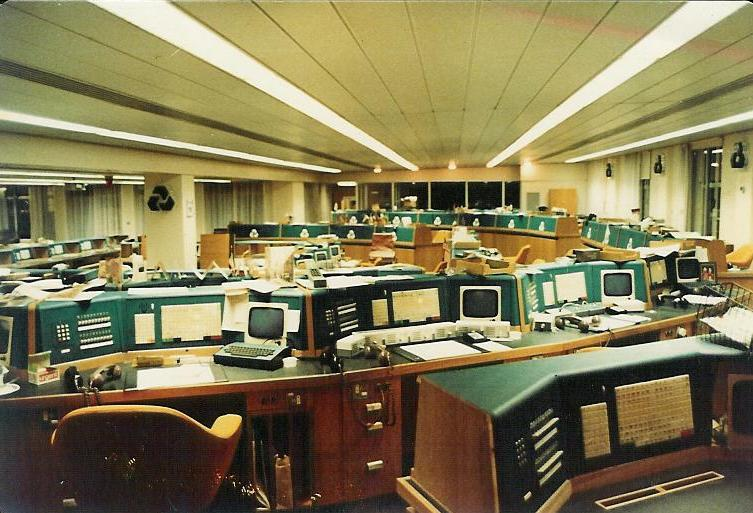
- Industry: Banking; Financial services
- Founded: 1913
- Defunct: 1989
- Fate: Merger with National Westminster Bank
- Successor: National Westminster Bank
- Headquarters: 41 Threadneedle Street, London
- Products: Commercial banking; Investment banking
- Number of employees: 900 (1980)
- Parent: National Westminster Bank

International Westminster Bank was a wholly owned subsidiary of National Westminster Bank and its predecessors from 1913 to 1989, with branches in London, France, Spain and West Germany.

At the peak of its operations during the 1980s, the bank had a multibillion-pound deposit base, principally through its London office, which administered the commercial loan and deposit book on behalf of National Westminster Bank's International Division. As such, it engaged in wholesale fixed-term deposits with other banks, corporates and some individual private customers; it accepted short term and medium deposits (up to 12 months) against issuance of its own dollar and sterling-denominated certificates of deposit (CDs); and it administered commercial loans to corporate clients and sovereign governments.

== History ==
The bank was formed as London County and Westminster Bank (Paris) Limited in 1913. It was renamed London County Westminster and Parr's Foreign Bank Limited in 1920 and shortened to Westminster Foreign Bank Limited in 1923, before assuming its final identity as International Westminster Bank Limited in 1973, following the merger of Westminster Bank and National Provincial Bank.

All the Spanish branches were closed in 1923-4 due to deteriorating economic conditions in Spain and discrimination against foreign banks. Control of the remaining branches was exercised from London, although between 1940 and 1944 contact with them was lost due to the German occupation.

Westminster Foreign Bank was granted a limited deposit licence in 1961, enabling it to start trading in the Eurodollar market. Its London deposit dealing desk was merged with National Westminster Bank's foreign exchange dealing desk in 1979, to form a combined trading operation named World Money Centre. This was located at 52-53 Threadneedle Street.

The London branch of International Westminster Bank, at 41 Threadneedle Street, continued to handle the back office settlements for the World Money Centre. In 1982, much of the London branch was relocated to NatWest's Drapers Gardens tower in nearby Throgmorton Avenue. The branch moved to its final location at the Kings Cross House tower block, 200 Pentonville Road, in the mid-1980s.

In 1980, National Westminster Bank acquired Global Bank AG; two years later, in 1982, International Westminster Bank's Frankfurt branch was merged with Global Bank, to form Deutsche Westminster Bank AG.

In 1988, International Westminster Bank's branches in France and Monaco were incorporated into National Westminster Bank S.A. After 80 years, NatWest announced its exit from French retail banking in 1993.

International Westminster Bank Act 1989
- Act of Parliament
- Parliament of the United Kingdom
- Long title: An Act to provide for the vesting in National Westminster Bank PLC of the undertaking of International Westminster Bank PLC; and for other purposes.
- Citation: 1989 c. xvi

Dates
- Royal assent: 16 November 1989

Text of statute as originally enacted

Eventually, the only remaining branch was the London office. Due to changes in international bank taxation arrangements, the bank's ongoing existence no longer offered any commercial advantage. In 1989, International Westminster Bank was merged into National Westminster Bank by a personal act of Parliament, the International Westminster Bank Act 1989 (c. xvi).

=== Branches ===
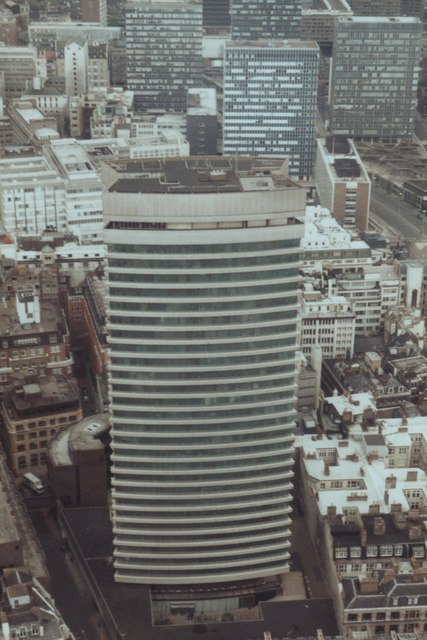
Drapers Gardens in the City of London. International Westminster Bank's London branch occupied levels 14 and 15 in this building from 1982 to 1987.

The bank opened the following branch offices between its formation in 1913 and its closure in 1989:

Branch	Established
London	1913
Paris	1913
Bordeaux	1917
Lyon	1918
Marseille	1918
Nantes	1919
Madrid	1917
Barcelona	1917
Antwerp	1919
Brussels	1919
Bilbao	1919
Valencia	1920
Nice	1970
Frankfurt	1972

== Associated companies ==
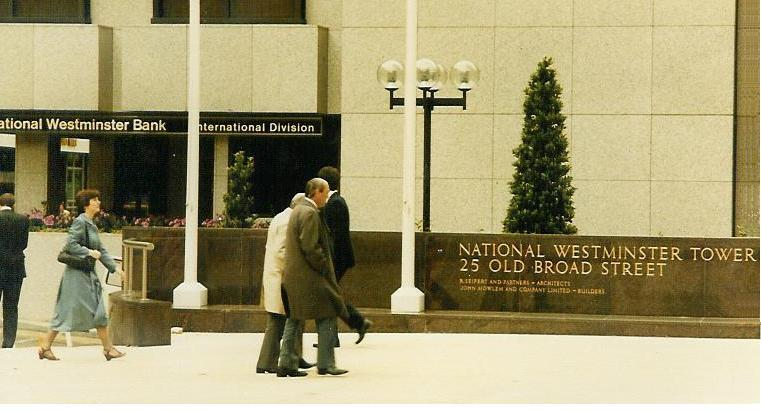
Forecourt of National Westminster Bank's International Division in 1981

International Westminster Bank was an integral part of NatWest Group's international banking division, which also comprised a number of overseas subsidiary and associated undertakings.

National Westminster Bank USA was formed in 1983 from the 1978 acquisition of the National Bank of North America. Following the 1988 acquisition of First Jersey National Bank, National Westminster Bancorp was formed as a US holding company for National Westminster Bank USA and National Westminster Bank NJ. In 1995, the subsidiaries were amalgamated into NatWest Bank, N.A. The Bancorp business was sold to Fleet Financial Group in 1996. National Westminster Bank of Canada was formed in 1982, providing domestic and international banking services through its branches in Montreal, Toronto, Calgary and Vancouver. The Canadian operation was sold to HSBC Bank Canada in 1998.

National Westminster (Hong Kong) Limited was formed in 1974, providing short and medium term loans in Hong Kong dollars and foreign currencies, foreign exchange and deposit taking facilities. The bank's reputation and long-standing involvement in meeting the financial needs of Australian enterprises were factors which led to NatWest Australia Bank obtaining a trading bank licence in 1986. The retail banking assets and liabilities in South Australia and Western Australia were sold to Challenge Bank (acquired by Westpac in 1995) and in Sydney, Melbourne and Brisbane to the State Bank of New South Wales (acquired by the Commonwealth Bank in 2000) for an undisclosed amount in 1993.

Lombard Bank (Malta) was established in 1969 and divested in stages to the Maltese government from 1975 to 1988. Lombard North Central had been active in Malta since 1955, accepting deposits through agents. Banco NatWest España was formed in 1990 by acquisition of the controlling interest in Banco NatWest March. The Spanish operation was sold to Banco Sabadell in 1996.

RoyWest Banking Corporation in Nassau, Bahamas was formed in 1965, to undertake mortgage and international investment banking in the British West Indies. Jointly owned by National Westminster Bank, the Royal Bank of Canada, the Hongkong & Shanghai Banking Corporation and Montreal Trust Company, it became NatWest International Trust when the bank increased its shareholding in 1987. Handelsbank in Zürich was acquired by National Westminster Bank in 1975; NatWest International Trust merged with Handelsbank NatWest to form the Coutts Group in 1990.

In 1973, National Westminster Bank acquired a minority interest in the Dutch firm F. van Lanschot, Bankiers. From 1990, until it sold its interest in 1994, it was the majority shareholder. From 1973, until it was divested to Credito Emiliano in 1995, Banca Creditwest e dei Comuni Vesuviani (formerly Banca Milanese di Credito) was majority owned by Credito Italiano with National Westminster Bank as a minority shareholder. It had around 30 branches in Rome, Milan and Naples.

== See also ==
- NatWest Markets
- RBS International
