= HSBC Bank India =

Bank in India

- Type: Subsidiary
- Industry: Finance and Insurance
- Founded: 1853; 173 years ago (as Mercantile Bank of India, London and China)
- Headquarters: Fort, Mumbai, Maharashtra, India
- Key people: Hitendra Dave (CEO)
- Products: Financial services
- Number of employees: 36,000 (as of June 2018)
- Parent: HSBC
- Website: www.hsbc.bank.in

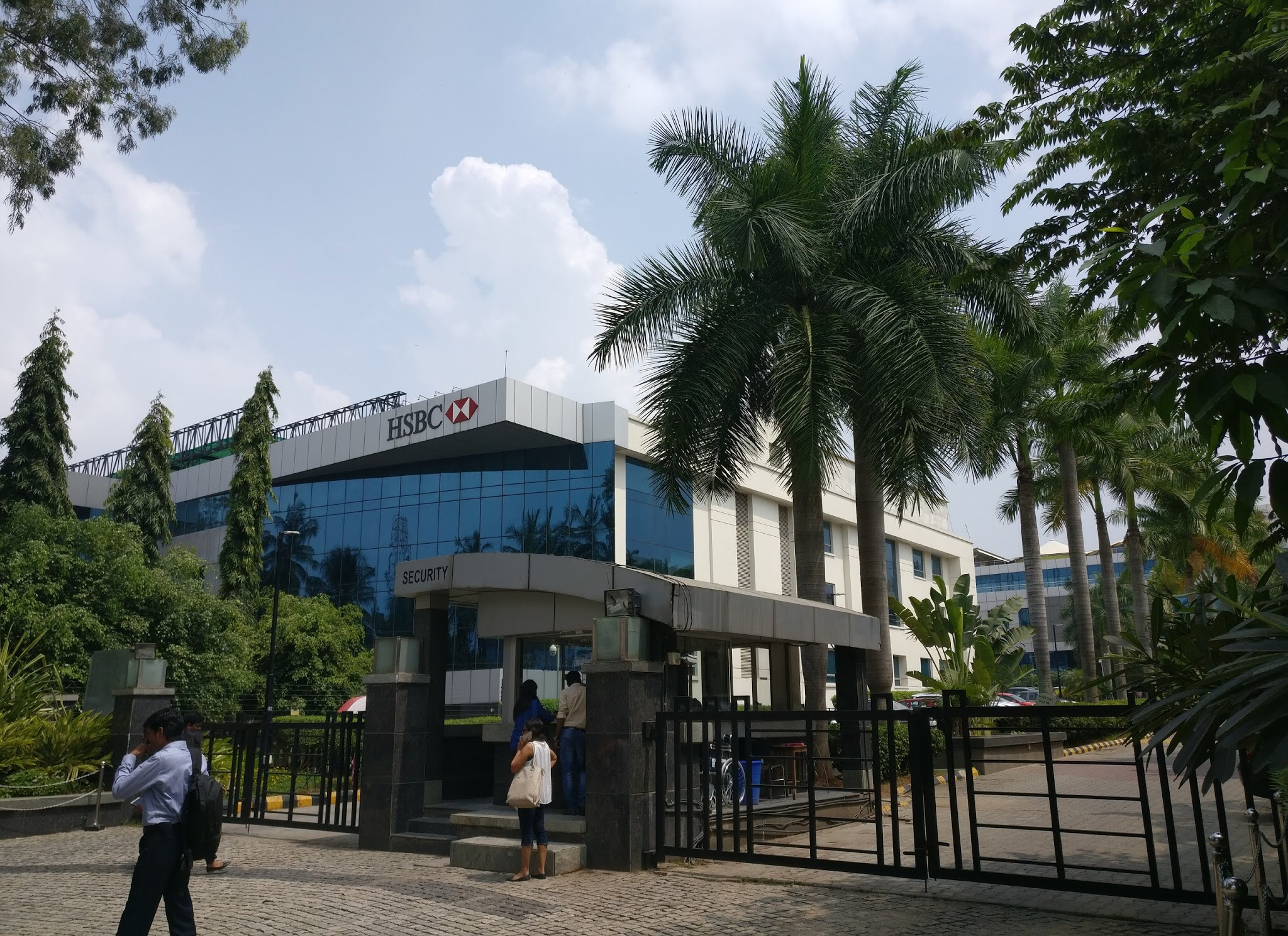
HSBC Electronic Data Processing Building in Bangalore

The Hongkong and Shanghai Banking Corporation Limited, India (HSBC India) or HSBC Bank India, is incorporated in Hong Kong SAR with limited liability. It is a foreign bank under the Banking Regulation Act, 1949 and thus is regulated by the Reserve Bank of India (RBI). As per the data available with the Ministry of Company Affairs (MCA), the Indian branch is registered under the number F00947 and is incorporated in India since 1 January 1983. The registered office is at Mumbai, India.

== Businesses ==
- Wealth and Personal Banking
- Commercial Banking
- Global Banking and Markets
- Credit Cards

== HSBC Group members in India ==
- The Hongkong and Shanghai Banking Corporation Limited
- HSBC Asset Management (India) Private Limited
- HSBC Electronic Data Processing (India) Private Limited
- HSBC Professional Services (India) Private Limited
- HSBC Securities and Capital Markets (India) Private Limited
- HSBC Software Development (India) Private Limited
- HSBC InvestDirect (India) Limited
- HSBC InvestDirect Securities (India) Private Limited
- HSBC InvestDirect Financial Service (India) Limited
- HSBC Agency (India) Private Limited
- HSBC Global Shared Services (India) Private Limited

== HSBC Technology India ==
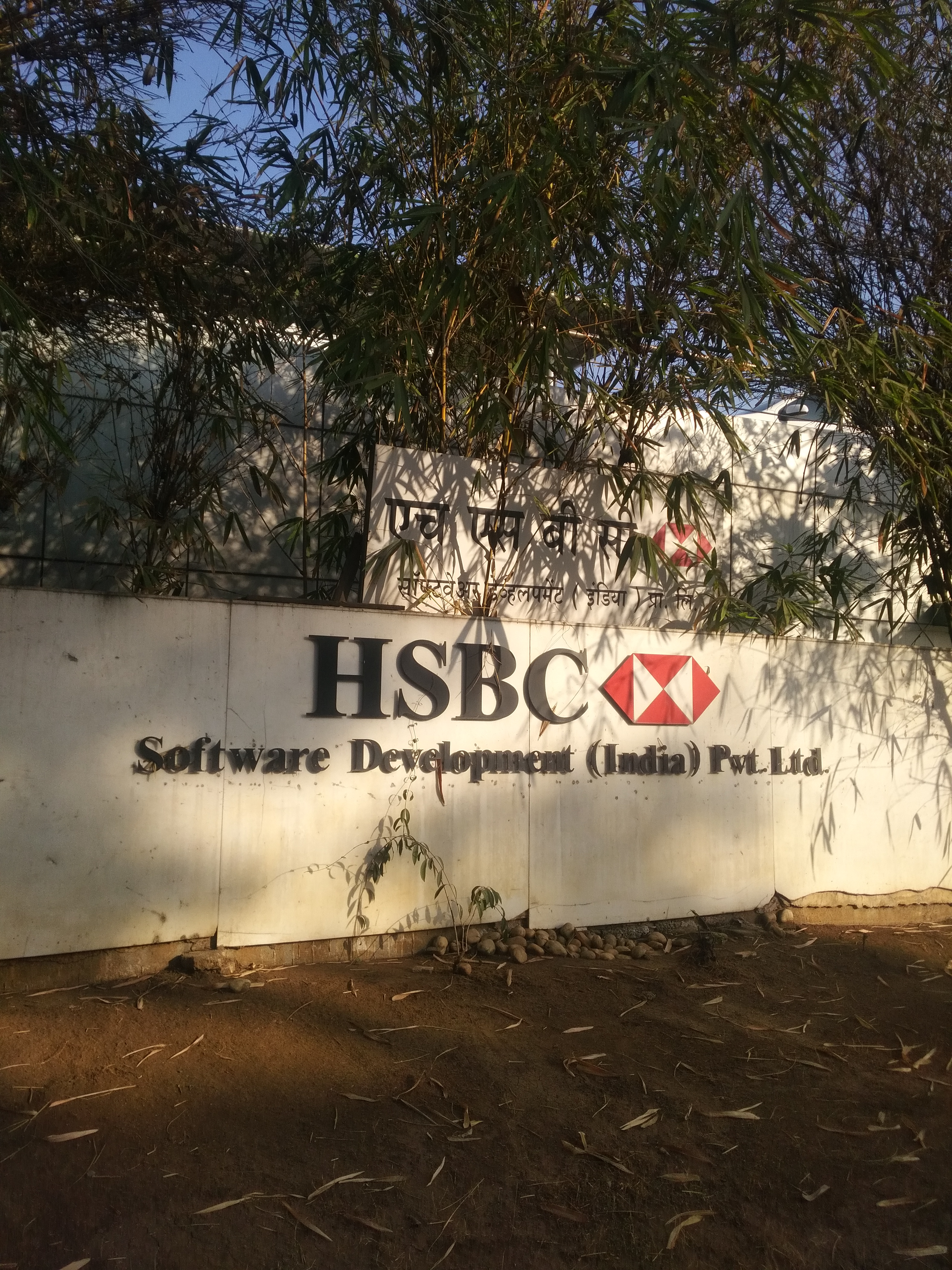
HSBC Software Development (India) Pvt. Ltd., Pune nameboard

HSBC Technology India (HTI), previously called HSBC Global Technology (GLT), is part of HSBC Technology, the Bank's technology function. HTI is located in Pune, India, and Hyderabad, India, with the former being the headquarters. HSBC Technology India has been in existence for over 15 years, and currently supports the majority of the software products that make up the Bank's technology eco-system.

HTI is headed by Pradip Menon, who is also global CIO for the Retail Banking and Wealth Management business, as well as Global Head of Application Development and Maintenance.

Apart from India, HSBC Technology centers are present in Sri Lanka, China, Malaysia, Poland, and Canada.
