= National Westminster Bank USA =

Former bank in the United States

National Westminster Bancorp, Inc.
- Type: Subsidiary undertaking
- Industry: Financial services
- Predecessor: National Bank of North America
- Founded: 1983; 43 years ago
- Defunct: 1996; 30 years ago
- Successor: Fleet Bank, N.A.
- Headquarters: New York, United States
- Parent: National Westminster Bank Plc

National Westminster Bank USA, commonly known as NatWest USA, was a wholly owned subsidiary of National Westminster Bank in the United Kingdom from 1983 to 1996. Formed as the National Bank of North America in 1905, the U.S. retail banking operation was sold to Fleet Financial Group in 1996.

During its existence, National Westminster Bank USA was a commercial bank with a national charter and a member of the Federal Reserve System, supervised by the Office of the Comptroller of the Currency.

== History ==
National Provincial Bank Limited first entered the United States with a branch in New York, shortly before merging with Westminster Bank Limited in 1970.

=== National Bank of North America ===
The National Bank of North America was founded in New York in 1851. In 1970, it acquired Trade Bank and Trust Company and the First National Bank in Yonkers, followed by the National Bank of Far Rockaway in 1972. An offshoot of the CIT Financial Corporation, which bought the bank in 1966, it earned a record US$25 million profit in 1974. However, by 1975, profits had plummeted to US$14 million as a result of bad loans and earlier poor investment strategies, dropping to US$10.2 million in 1976.

In 1978, the National Bank of North America's 141 branches were acquired by National Westminster Bank Ltd. for US$429 million. A Delaware-registered holding company, NatWest Holdings, Inc., was formed to facilitate the purchase and, by 1986, net income had more than tripled to US$54.5 million. Among other significant early developments was the acquisition of 16 branches from Bankers Trust Company in 1979, at a cost of US$11 million.

To broaden the range of services provided a domestic factoring business, NatWest Commercial Services, Inc., commenced operations in New York and Philadelphia in 1982. The year also marked the opening of NBNA's international banking office in Miami through North America International Corporation, a subsidiary established under the provisions of the Edge Act. In 1983, the National Bank of North America was renamed National Westminster Bank USA.

=== First Jersey National Bank ===
The First National Bank of Jersey City was formed in 1868, taking the name First Jersey National Bank in 1968. The bank vault was designed by Frederick S. Holmes. Following the US$820 million acquisition of First Jersey National Corporation in 1988, it became National Westminster Bancorp NJ. National Westminster Bancorp, Inc. was subsequently organized as a holding company for National Westminster Bank USA and National Westminster Bank NJ. Its headquarters were relocated to Jersey City, New Jersey in 1993. After acquiring Citizens First Bancorp in 1994 and the Central Jersey Bank and Trust Company in 1995, National Westminster Bank USA merged with National Westminster Bank NJ under the name NatWest Bank, National Association.

NatWest Bank (Delaware), N.A. was also formed in 1995. It engaged principally in consumer lending on a nationwide basis, offering a full range of services including credit cards, lines of credit, installment loans, student loans and home equity loans. NatWest Services, Inc. in Scranton, Pennsylvania provided the operations and servicing facility for NatWest Bank, N.A. and NatWest Bank (Delaware).

Having struggled without success to make the operation profitable, NatWest Bancorp was divested for US$2.5 billion in 1996; its 300 branch network merging with Fleet Bank of New York, N.A. to form Fleet Bank, N.A. In 2002, it was incorporated into Fleet National Bank based in Providence, Rhode Island, before being merged into and subsequently operated as part of Bank of America, N.A. from 2005.

== See also ==
- International Westminster Bank
- National Westminster Bank of Canada
- Greenwich NatWest
- NatWest Three
