= Lombard North Central =

British finance company

Lombard North Central plc
- Type: Subsidiary
- Industry: Financial services
- Founded: Rotherham, West Riding of Yorkshire 1861
- Headquarters: Crawley, England, UK
- Products: Hire purchase, Insurance, Leasing, Loans
- Owner: NatWest Group
- Website: lombard.co.uk

Lombard North Central, trading as Lombard, is a finance company specialising in asset based lending. It is one of the largest finance houses in the United Kingdom and part of the ring-fenced business of NatWest Group. The company started life hiring out rolling stock to the railways in 1861.

== History ==
=== Foundation as railway wagon leasing company ===
The North Central Wagon Co was set up in Rotherham, West Riding of Yorkshire, in 1861. A group of astute investors see the business possibilities in leasing wagons to local railway companies, collieries and quarries. A black diamond representing a lump of coal was adopted as the company's symbol. By 1900, nearly 25,000 railway wagons were on hire. After the First World War, the company began to move into financing road transport.

=== Prudential Assurance buys the company ===
In 1928, Prudential Assurance Company and the financier Connop Guthrie bought out the company, seeing huge potential. Prudential remained a major shareholder for the next thirty years and Guthrie, an entrepreneur knighted in 1936, transformed the business through acquisition and organic growth. After the Second World War, and nationalisation of the railways, the company moved more into financing cars and consumer durables.

During the beginning of the 1950s, the North Central Wagon and Finance Co diversified by partnering with merchant bankers Seligman Brothers.

=== National Westminster Bank becomes new owner ===
By 1958, banks began to acquire links with hire purchase companies, and National Provincial Bank bought out the company. After the merger of National Provincial Bank and Westminster Bank in 1968, North Central Finance became a subsidiary of the new National Westminster Bank.

Lombard Banking was taken over by National Westminster Bank in 1970. From its origins in 1946, Lombard Banking had developed hire purchase activities and become one of the largest finance houses in the United Kingdom. In 1971, Lombard Banking and North Central Finance were merged to form Lombard North Central.

Lombank Canada was formed as a subsidiary of Lombard Banking in 1955. In 1975, it became Lombard NatWest Canada and the following year the share capital passed from Lombard North Central to National Westminster Bank and it was renamed NatWest Canada.

Lombard Banking had also been active in Malta since 1955, accepting deposits through agents. Lombard Bank (Malta) was established in 1969 and divested in stages to the Maltese government from 1975 to 1988.

During the 1970s, Lombard's 'big ticket' leasing for such items as aircraft, ships and petrochemical works grew. In 1979, Lombard North Central was licensed as a deposit taking institution under the new Banking Act. In the 1980s, asset based financing for business grew dramatically. A Corporate Finance department began to specialise in tailoring and negotiating facilities for major companies, pioneering combined leasing of industrial buildings, plant and machinery.

In consumer finance, finance is provided for consumer durables at over 20,000 retail outlets. The 1980s also brought an increase in Lombard's motor finance, working from 123 offices across the United Kingdom. Links were built with major motor manufacturers and dealers. These relationships were reflected in the company's sponsorship of the annual Lombard RAC Rally from 1978 to 1992.

=== Rebrand ===
In 1995, Lombard North Central changed its corporate identity, and adopted the simple title of Lombard. Lombard Direct was launched as a telephone loans service for personal customers. Lombard Corporate Finance was also created, developing new leasing products for sectors such as films, aviation, maritime, technology and private finance.

At the end of 1998, Lombard secured its biggest deal to date, winning a bid to finance the purchase of 78 trains for Virgin Rail Group worth over £395 million. The business now specialised in distinct market segments, Lombard in asset finance for businesses, Lombard Direct in direct personal finance, and Lombard Banking Services in banking for overseas clients.

At this time, the company head office was now located at 3 Princess Way in Redhill, Surrey, just adjacent to the Warwick Quadrant. Lombard was one of the town's biggest employers and remained so for a number of years.

In February 2000, National Westminster Bank was acquired by The Royal Bank of Scotland (RBS) and two of RBS' subsidiaries, RoyScot Trust and Royal Bank Leasing, were merged into Lombard. RBS Group was renamed NatWest Group in 2020.

Lombard Manx Leasing Limited (trading as Lombard Gibraltar), Lombard Manx Limited (Isle of Man) and Lombard Finance (CI) Limited (Jersey and Guernsey) are wholly owned subsidiaries of Lombard North Central.

== Lombard Direct ==
Lombard launched Lombard Direct as a personal finance brand in 1995, initially as a telephone loans service. Lombard Direct provided loans within the limit of £800 to £15,000, and became known for their advertising featuring an animated anthropomorphic talking blue telephone (voiced by Enn Reitel). In August 2009, Lombard Direct discontinued writing new personal loans, and closed to new business.

== Sponsorship ==
Lombard have sponsored various sporting events and athletes, including rowing champions Steve Redgrave and Matthew Pinsent, who represented the United Kingdom and won the country's only gold medal at the 1996 Summer Olympics in Atlanta, and also at the Sydney Summer Olympics of 2000. Lombard are title sponsors of the PGA and WPGA Lombard Trophy, a Pro-Am Golf Tournament. Regional finals take place across the United Kingdom, with the grand final taking place in Portugal. Lombard were also title sponsors of the Rally GB from 1974 to 1992.
