= 41 Lothbury =

Office building in London, England

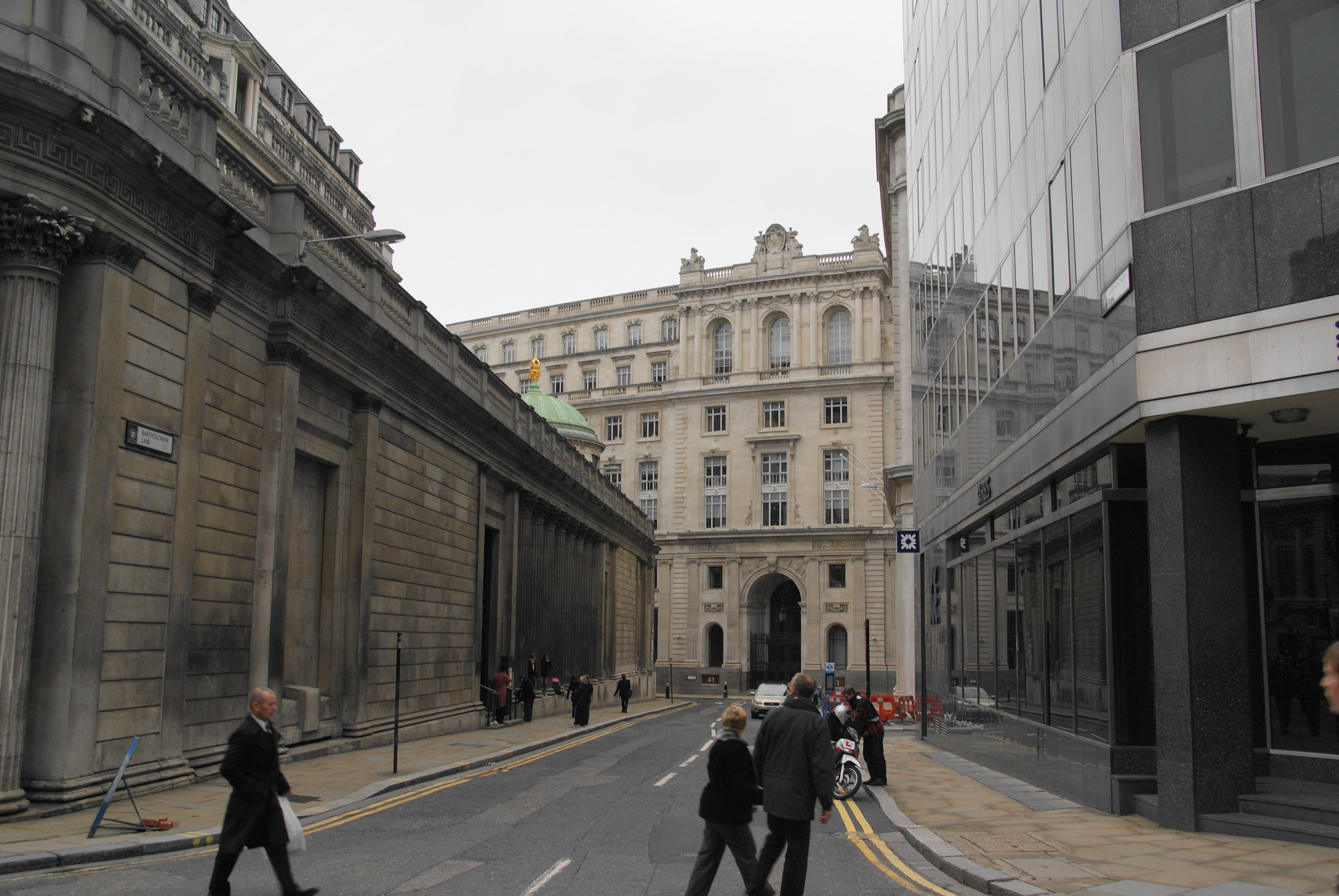
- 41 Lothbury as seen down Bartholomew Lane
- Interactive map of the 41 Lothbury area

General information
- Type: Office
- Location: London, England
- Coordinates: 51°30′54″N 0°05′17″W
- Completed: 1931

Design and construction
- Architects: Mewes and Davis

Listed Building – Grade II*
- Official name: National Westminster Bank including Lothbury Gallery
- Designated: 06 April 1988
- Reference no.: 1079136

41 Lothbury or the National Westminster Bank Building is an office building that stands on Lothbury overlooking Bartholomew Lane in the City of London. It is a Grade II* listed by English Heritage.

== History and description ==
41 Lothbury was the site of the headquarters of Westminster Bank since 1838. The current building was constructed between 1923 and 1931 as their new head offices, replacing the 1838 building of Sir William Tite. It was built in three phases, designed by architects Charles Mewès and Arthur Joseph Davis who had won a competition for the design. The building would remain as their headquarters after 1970 merger with the National Provincial Bank to form the National Westminster Bank.

The building's banking hall was transformed into an exhibition space in 1996 by DEGW. In 2000, the offices would become redundant following the Royal Bank of Scotland takeover of NatWest in 2000, and a rebuilding of the office space would follow while maintaining the original facade.

== See also ==
- Westminster Bank Building
