= HSBC Bank Canada =

Former Canadian subsidiary of multinational bank HSBC

- Formerly: Hongkong Bank of Canada
- Type: Former subsidiary
- Industry: Banking
- Founded: July 1, 1981; 45 years ago
- Defunct: March 31, 2024; 2 years ago
- Fate: Acquired by the Royal Bank of Canada (RBC)
- Headquarters: 885 West Georgia Street; Vancouver, British Columbia; V6C 3E9
- Key people: Samuel Minzberg (chairman); Linda Seymour (president and CEO)
- Products: Financial services
- Revenue: ▲CA$2.22 billion (2021)
- Net income: ▲$717 million (2021)
- AUM: ▲$224 million (2021)
- Total assets: ▲$119.85 billion (2021)
- Total equity: ▲$6.88 billion (2021)
- Owner: HSBC (1981–2024); Royal Bank of Canada (2024)
- Number of employees: 5,500+ (FTE, 2020)

HSBC Bank Canada (French: Banque HSBC Canada), formerly the Hongkong Bank of Canada (HBC), was a British-Canadian chartered bank and the former Canadian subsidiary of British multinational banking and financial services company HSBC founded in 1981.

It was the seventh largest bank in Canada, with offices in every province except Prince Edward Island, and was the largest foreign-owned bank in the country. The corporate headquarters were located at the HSBC Canada Building in downtown Vancouver, British Columbia.

On March 28, 2024, the Royal Bank of Canada completed their acquisition of HSBC Canada.

== History ==
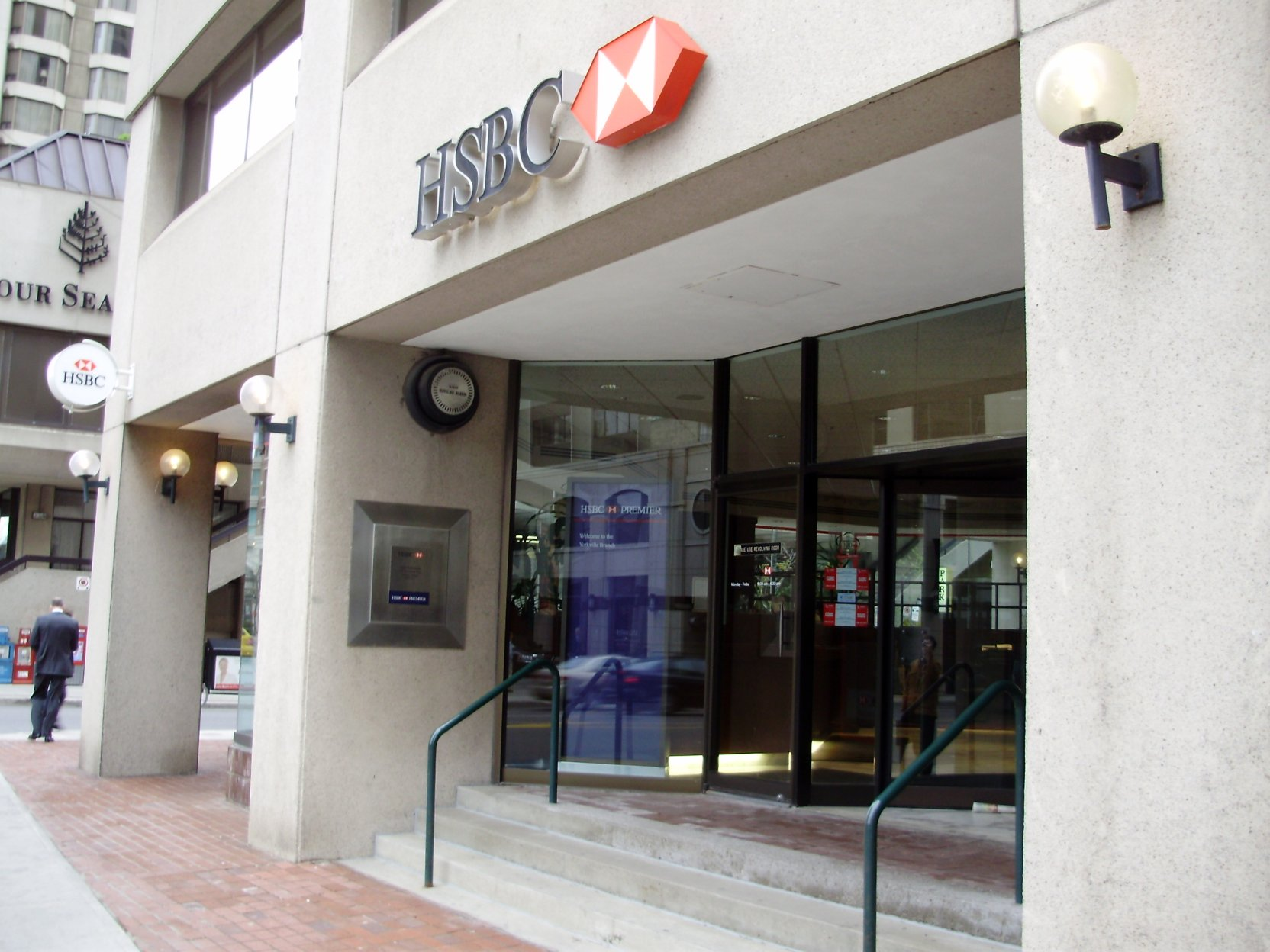
An HSBC Bank Canada branch in Toronto, 2008

In 1979, The Hongkong and Shanghai Banking Corporation bought a Vancouver-based acceptance company that financed machinery and equipment for small companies operating in British Columbia. In 1981, The Hongkong and Shanghai Banking Corporation incorporated Hongkong Bank of Canada (HBC), in Vancouver as a chartered bank effective July 1, 1981, under the Bank Act of Canada using the acceptance company as a base for the new bank. HBC had a few retail branches primarily focused on Asian-Canadians whose primary business centred on commercial enterprises. HBC opened branches in major cities in western Canada and in Toronto and Montreal but growth was slow. HBC sought to grow by acquisition, but the first three attempts to buy an existing institution were unsuccessful. HBC acquired the assets of Bank of British Columbia on November 27, 1986, which had essentially failed. This acquisition gave HBC an additional $2.6 billion in assets and 41 branches in British Columbia and Alberta propelling it overnight from the 20th largest to 9th largest bank in Canada.

On May 20, 1988, HBC amalgamated with Midland Bank Canada, gaining many new corporate banking relationships, combined assets of $472 million, and expanding to Eastern Canada. It acquired Lloyds Bank Canada on May 29, 1990, thereby adding another $4.4 billion in assets and 53 branches. Lloyds Bank had acquired Continental Bank of Canada in 1986. Continental Bank began in 1973 as Niagara Finance Company, later became IAC Limited, and then Continental Bank.

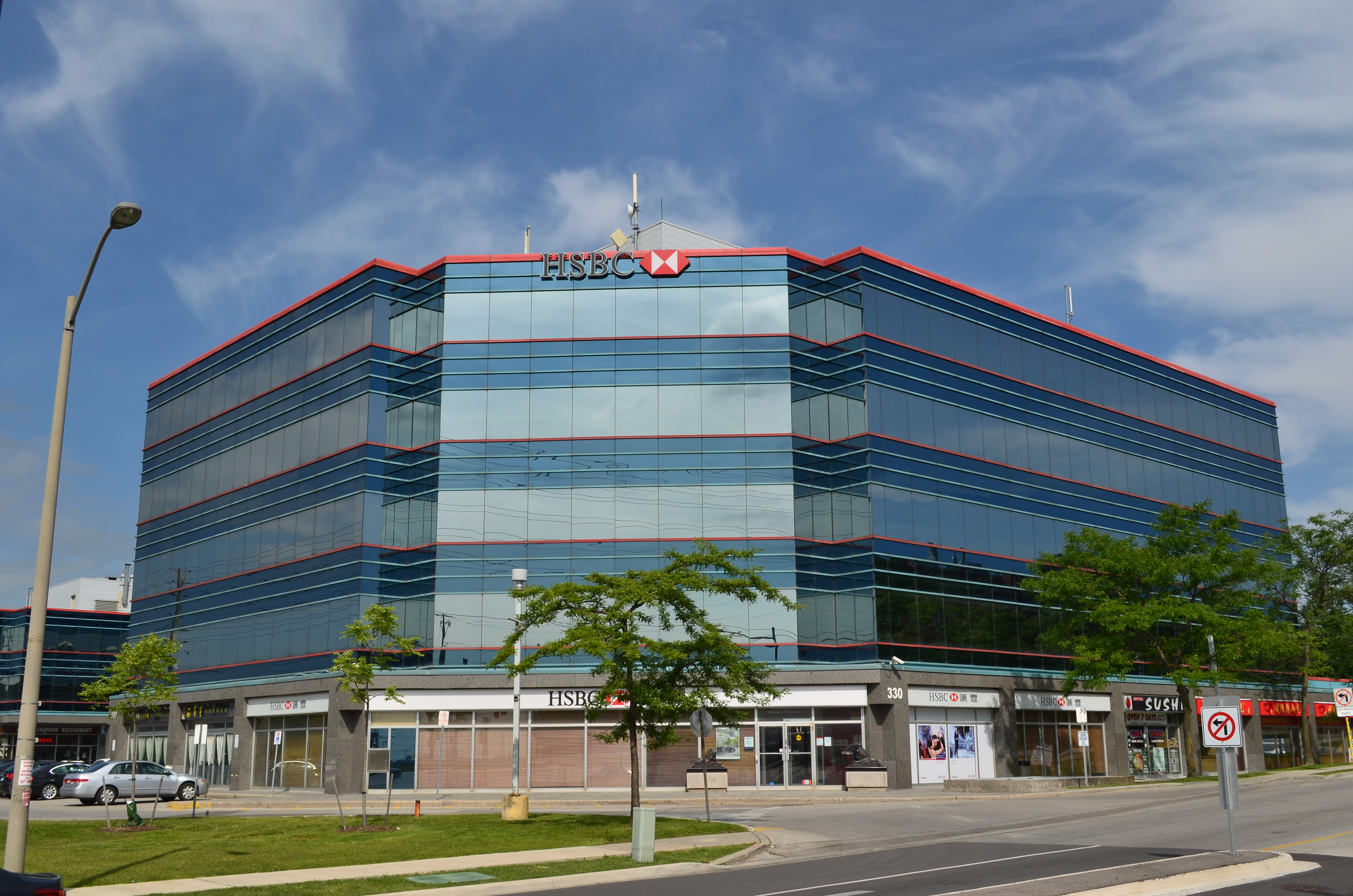
An HSBC Bank Canada branch in Richmond Hill, Ontario, 2014

By October 31, 1990, HBC's assets were $10.2 billion and its branch network had doubled with most of its newly acquired branches located in Ontario and Quebec. The acquisition of Lloyds also made the company Canada's largest foreign bank and a bilingual operation with branches in eight Quebec communities. On April 30, 1993, HBC acquired ANZ Canada consisting of one office in Toronto, which it combined with the existing HBC branch at 70 York Street. ANZ had acquired Grindlays Bank Canada with its 1984 acquisition of Grindlays Bank, but management sold the component to HBC to focus on expansion in the Asia-Pacific area. The purchase of ANZ made HBC the seventh largest bank in Canada with branches in every province except Prince Edward Island. HBC acquired the single-office Metropolitan Trust Company of Canada on August 1, 1995.

HBC acquired Barclays Bank Canada on August 31, 1996. Barclays had re-entered Canada in 1979 and developed a diversified but modest range of activities. In 1985, Barclays bought the assets of Wells Fargo Bank (Canada), consisting of its operations in Alberta and Florida, so that Wells Fargo could re-focus on its home market. In 1993, Barclays Bank Canada closed its Edmonton branch and the following year, it closed six additional branches in Vancouver, Calgary, Winnipeg, London, Montreal and Halifax, retaining only its head office. Barclays' Canadian operations lost approximately $120-million between 1992 and 1996.

In response to the growing north-south trade occasioned by the adoption of the 1994 North American Free Trade Agreement (NAFTA), HBC acquired the Seattle, Washington and Portland, Oregon branches of Marine Midland Bank in 1996. This move into the United States seemed a natural expansion that followed the business interests of many of the bank's customers. HBC acquired National Westminster Bank of Canada on May 1, 1998, which had assets of Can$844.5 million. NatWest had entered Canada in 1982. On June 21, 1999, HBC changed its name to HSBC Bank Canada, consistent with the HSBC Group's strategy of creating the global brand, HSBC. On December 3 of that year, it acquired Prenor Trust Company of Canada.

In 2000, HSBC Bank Canada acquired Republic National Bank of New York (Canada) after HSBC acquired the parent bank. Republic had entered Canada in 1982, and was an amalgamation of several banks. Republic's purchases included Bank Leumi Le Israel (Canada) in 1993; Israel-based Bank Hapoalim (Canada) in 1994; and Israel Discount Bank of Canada's in 1996.

On April 1, 2001, HSBC Canada acquired CCF Canada after HSBC Holdings acquired CCF Canada's parent company, Crédit Commercial de France (CCF). CCF had just acquired Crédit Lyonnais Canada. Credit Commercial de France (Canada) had entered Canada in 1982 when it established an office in Montreal. Société Générale (Canada) acquired it in 1990. CCF had returned to Canada in 2000.

In 2002, HSBC Holdings merged its Canadian and US operations to create a North American transnational bank. HSBC Bank USA of New York, with assets of US$87 billion, and HSBC Canada, with assets of Can$34 billion, share some operating resources but remain separate units. On June 1, 2004, HSBC Bank Canada completed its acquisition of Intesa Bank's Canadian unit, which had 11 branches and total assets of Can$1.1 billion.

On September 20, 2011, HSBC Canada sold its full-service brokerage division, HSBC Securities (Canada) Inc., to National Bank Financial Group for Can$208 million. In June 2015, Sandra Stuart was named president and CEO, becoming the first woman to head a Canadian chartered bank.

=== Merger with RBC ===
In November 2022, HSBC announced the exit of the Canadian market. Royal Bank of Canada (RBC) will acquire 100% of the common shares of HSBC Canada for an all-cash purchase price of $13.5 billion, which is a multiple of 9.4 times HSBC Canada's estimated 2024 earnings. Completion of the transaction was expected by late 2023, subject to regulatory approvals. HSBC has been under pressure to cut costs and divest non-Asian businesses.

The acquisition was completed on March 28, 2024. All HSBC Canada branches closed at midday on March 28. Twenty-five of these branches, most in close proximity to existing RBC branches, closed permanently with the sale; the others reopened as RBC branches on April 1, 2024.

== Operations and corporate structure ==
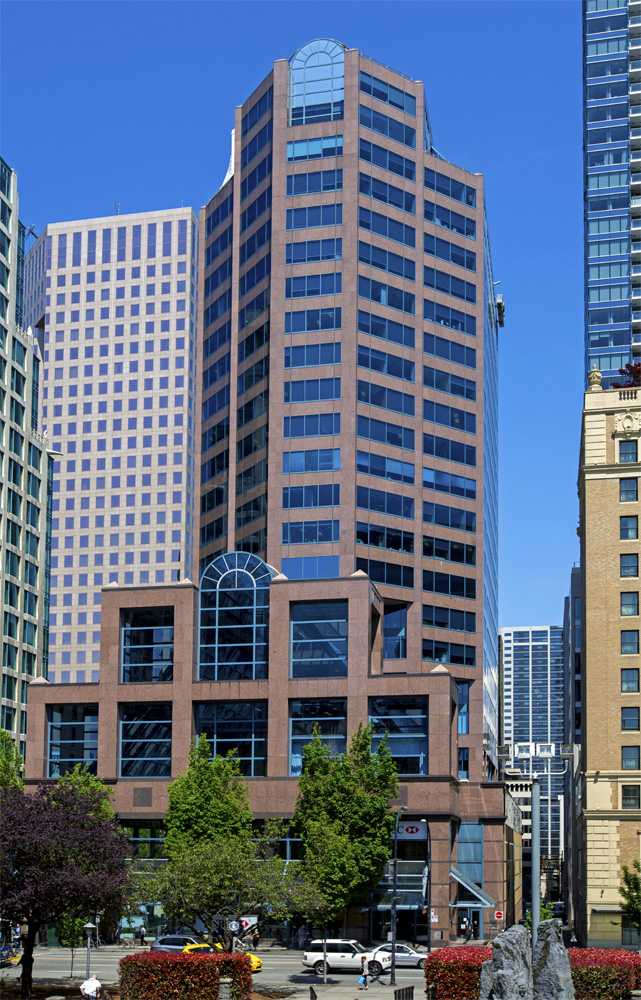
The HSBC Canada Building in Vancouver housed the headquarters for HSBC's Canadian subsidiary

Operating divisions of HSBC:

- HSBC Investments (Canada)
- HSBC Capital (Canada)
- HSBC Trust Company (Canada)
- HSBC Securities (Canada), which includes a discount brokerage division called HSBC InvestDirect
- HSBC Insurance Agency (Canada)

=== Executives ===
- Linda Seymour, president and chief executive officer
- Larry Tomei, executive vice president of retail banking and wealth management
- Jason Henderson, executive vice president and managing director, head of global banking and markets
- Dan Hankinson, chief financial officer
- Sophia Tsui, chief risk officer
- Supreet Warna, chief administrative officer

== Memberships ==
HSBC Canada was a member of the Canadian Bankers Association (CBA) and registered member with the Canada Deposit Insurance Corporation (CDIC), a federal agency insuring deposits at all of Canada's chartered banks. It was also a member of:

- Interac
- MasterCard
- Cirrus Network
- The Exchange

Effective March 15, 2010, BMO Bank of Montreal ceased accepting deposits at its ATMs from HSBC customers and resumed charging a convenience fee after five years of an ATM sharing agreement with HSBC Bank Canada. HSBC continues as a member of The Exchange Network. This was a decision HSBC took as part of a restructuring of its personal banking strategy. Instead, HSBC will rebate the convenience fee charged to its HSBC Premier qualified customers to a maximum of $2.00 per instance for using any ATM in Canada.

== Sponsorships ==
- Toronto Blue Jays Baseball Club
- Vancouver Canucks Hockey Club
- The Vancouver Sun Run
- HSBC Celebration of Light
- HSBC SVNS Vancouver
- Rugby Canada
- Calgary Flames Hockey Club
- MMICC - McGill Management International Case Competition in Montreal, QC
- Jetbridges at Toronto Pearson International Airport, Vancouver International Airport, Montreal-Trudeau International Airport and Calgary International Airport

== See also ==
- List of banks and credit unions in Canada
- Royal Bank of Canada, its successor.
