= National Westminster Bank of Canada =

Subsidiary of National Westminster Bank (1982–98)

National Westminster Bank Banque National Westminster
- Company type: Subsidiary undertaking
- Industry: Financial services
- Founded: 1982; 44 years ago
- Defunct: 1998; 28 years ago
- Successor: Hongkong Bank of Canada
- Headquarters: Toronto, Ontario, Canada
- Parent: National Westminster Bank Plc

National Westminster Bank of Canada (French: Banque National Westminster du Canada), commonly known as NatWest Canada, was a wholly owned subsidiary of National Westminster Bank, a global integrated financial service group based in the United Kingdom, which operated from 1982 to 1998.

== History ==
The Canadian operation provided domestic and international banking services through its branches in Montreal, Toronto, Calgary and Vancouver. It was chartered in 1982 and acquired by Hongkong Bank of Canada, a subsidiary of HSBC Holdings, pursuant to statutory amalgamation agreements in 1998. At the time, net assets were CAN$107m. The following year, HBC became HSBC Bank Canada, consistent with their strategy of creating a global brand.

=== Earlier operations ===
Lombank Canada Limited was formed as a subsidiary of London-based Lombard Banking Limited in 1955. Lombard Banking was acquired by National Westminster Bank in 1970 and merged with North Central Finance in 1971, to form Lombard North Central. In 1975, Lombank Canada became Lombard NatWest Canada Ltd. and the following year the share capital passed from Lombard North Central to National Westminster Bank and it was renamed NatWest Canada Limited. NatWest Canada carried on business in the corporate sector until 1982, dealing largely with multinational and large Canadian companies.

== See also ==
- International Westminster Bank
- National Westminster Bank USA
