= RBC Place =

Office building in Vancouver, Canada

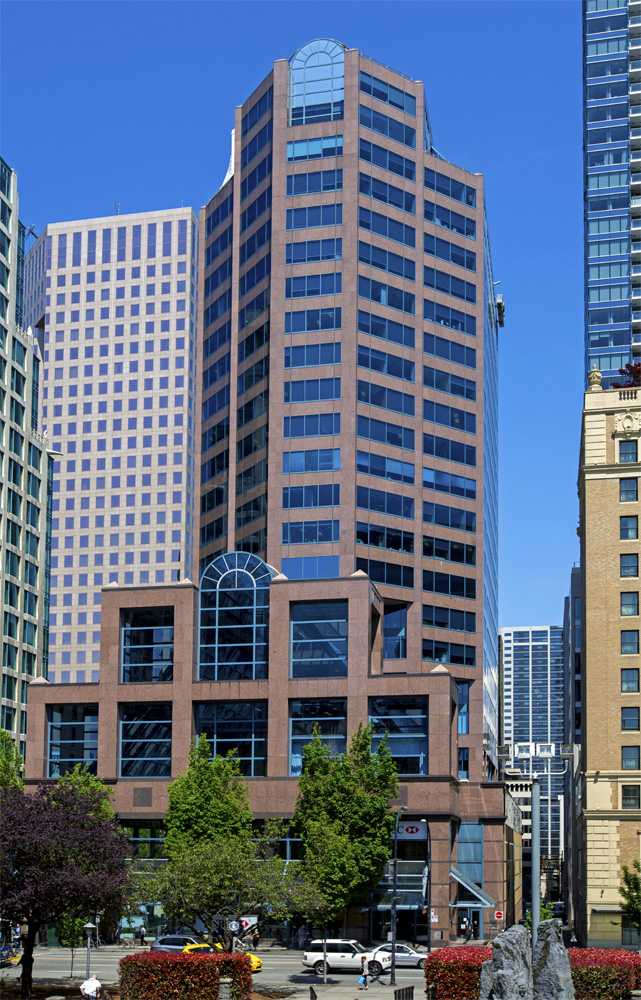
- The former HSBC Canada building in 2015

General information
- Type: Office
- Location: 885 West Georgia Street; Vancouver, British Columbia; V6C 3E9
- Coordinates: 49°17′2.56″N 123°7′9.09″W
- Construction started: 1984
- Opened: 1986
- Owner: Cadillac Fairview

Height
- Height: 100.5 m (330 ft)

Technical details
- Floor count: 23 (+2 below-grade)
- Floor area: 35,517 m^{2} (382,300 sq ft)

Design and construction
- Architect: WZMH Architects

The RBC Place (formerly HSBC Canada building) is a 23-storey office tower in the city's downtown core of Vancouver, British Columbia, Canada. The building's primary tenant was the headquarters of HSBC Bank Canada, the former Canadian subsidiary of HSBC. The skyscraper, built on the site of the former Hotel Devonshire (built 1925 and demolished 1981), was originally designed by WZMH Architects for the Bank of British Columbia. The assets of the Bank of British Columbia were acquired by HSBC Bank Canada in 1986. It was renamed "RBC Place" in 2024.

The building's lobby features a gigantic magnetically induced pendulum artwork entitled "The Pendulum" by Alan Storey. The building has been home to HSBC Canada since 1987.

The building, aside from its prominent role within the banking and financial industries, is also host to several shops and businesses that cater to those who work, live, and play in and around the Financial District. For example: Lasik MD's clinic, a laser eye surgery service provider and Sciué, an Italian artisan pizza/coffee stand are both located in the lobby.

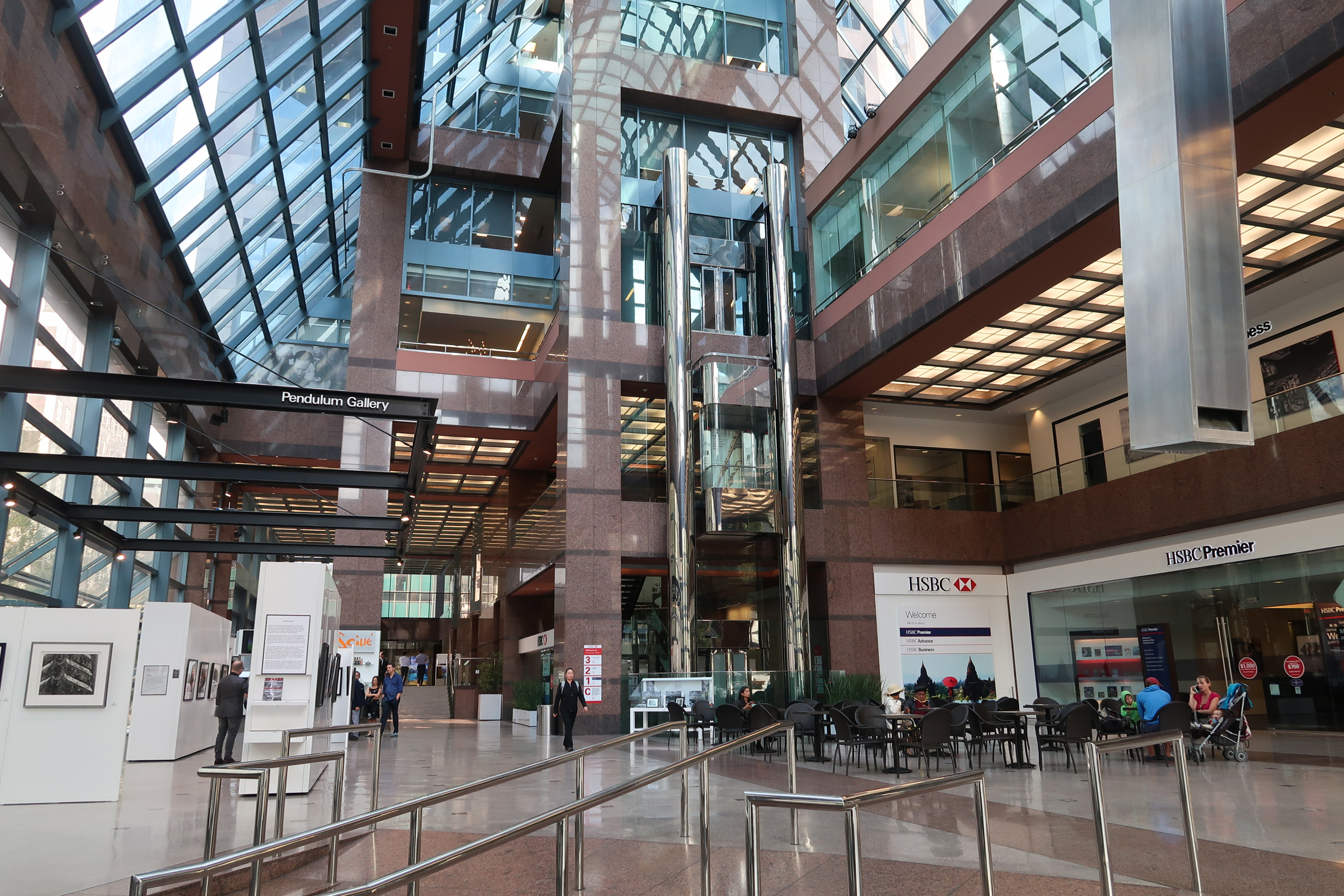
Lobby

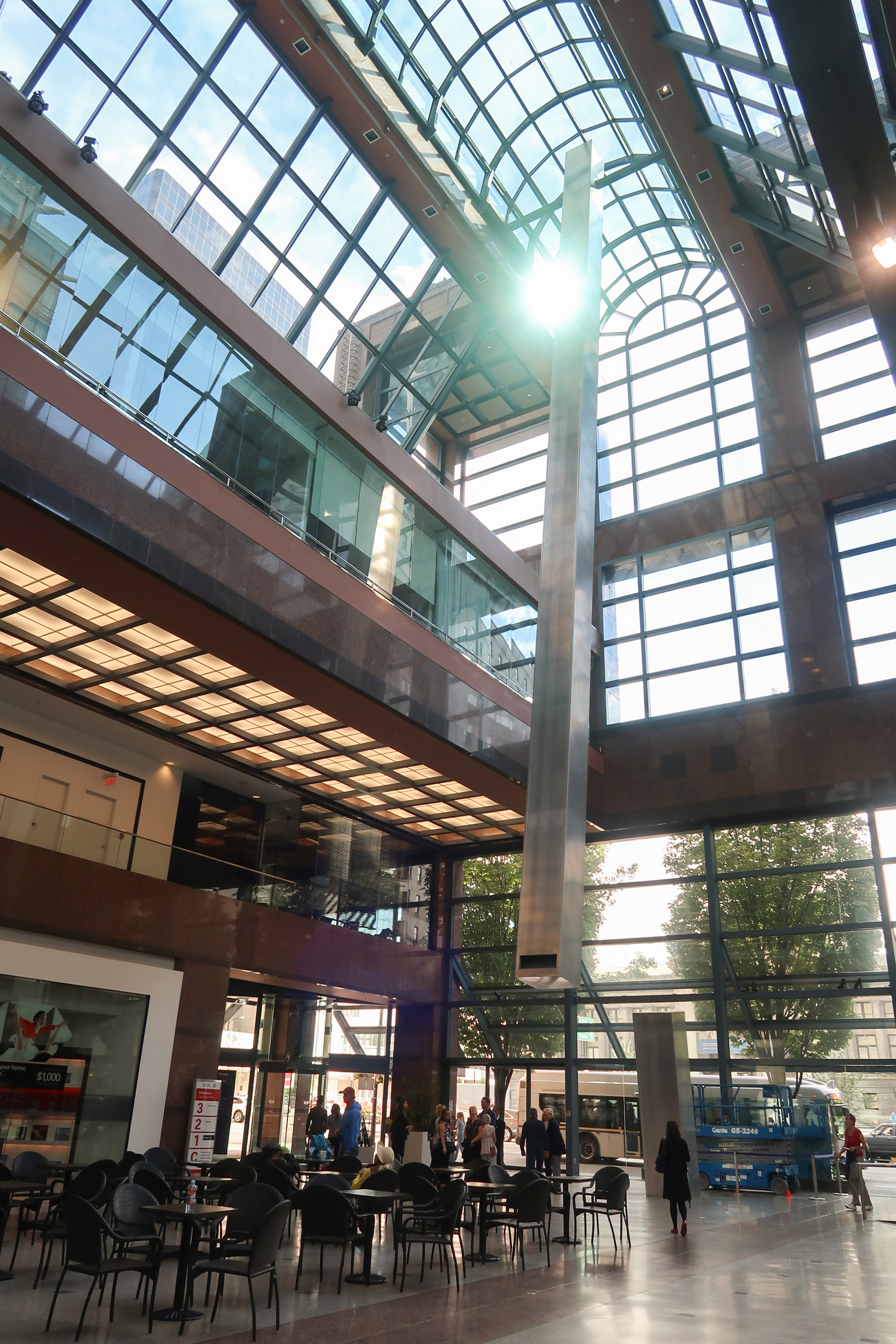
The Pendulum

== See also ==
- List of tallest buildings in Vancouver
