= HSBC InvestDirect =

Retail electronic trading platform by HSBC

HSBC InvestDirect is the retail electronic trading platform by HSBC Securities, for DIY Investors. HSBC InvestDirect is intended for those who understand the loss of capital investment risks involved in trading in the capital markets, since no portfolio management advice is provided as part of the service. HSBC InvestDirect operates independently from their wealth management business.

== Financial Jurisdictions ==
HSBC InvestDirect is available in certain jurisdictions. HSBC InvestDirect is available to HSBC Canada (Canadian domiciled), HSBC Expat (Jersey domiciled) and HSBC UK (United Kingdom domiciled) account holders and to the residents of other countries that the aforementioned jurisdictions allow. HSBC InvestDirect Expat and HSBC InvestDirect Canada allow non-residents to open HSBC InvestDirect accounts.

In 2013, HSBC InvestDirect India ceased operations.
