= Central Bank of London =

British commercial bank

The Central Bank of London was a British commercial bank, based in London, England. The bank operated between 1863 and 1891 when it was acquired the Birmingham and Midland Bank.

== History ==
=== Formation and Operations ===
The bank was established in 1863 as the 'East London Bank', with its offices located in Cornhill in the City of London. Its early business was closely related to the East End trades, and so branches were soon opened at Southwark, Shoreditch and Whitechapel.

Deposits had reached £495,000 by 1865, and by 1870 the bank was renamed the 'Central Bank of London'. In the mid 1870s further branches opened in Mile End, Blackfriars, Tottenham Court Road, Newgate Street and Clerkenwell. Deposits grew to £1 million in 1877 and further branches were opened at Shaftesbury Avenue and Bethnal Green during the 1880s.

In 1889 the bank acquired the failing Bethnal Green Bank.

=== Fate ===
Still relatively small when compared to other competing London banks, the bank was acquired by the Birmingham and Midland Bank (established in 1836), which was looking for a London operation to serve its expansion. At the point of acquisition the bank's deposits had peaked at £1.6 million, with paid-up capital at £156,000 and ten open branches.

The amalgamated bank was renamed the 'London and Midland Bank', occupying the Central Bank's headquarters in Cornhill. This bank eventually became the 'Midland Bank' and then was finally acquired by HSBC in 1992.
