= Westminster Bank =

British retail bank (1834–1970)

Westminster Bank Limited
- Coat of arms of Westminster Bank

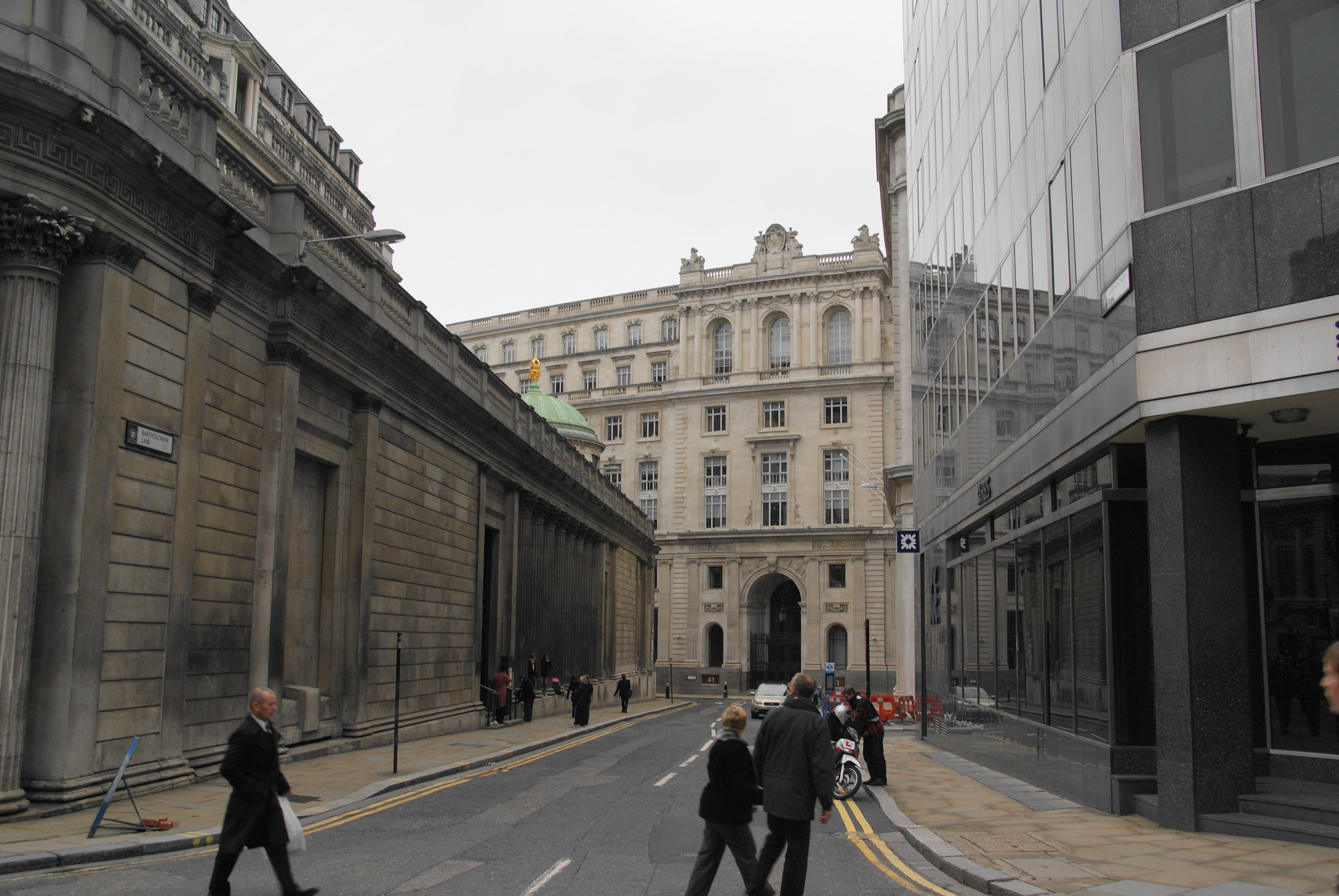
- Former head office of Westminster Bank at 41 Lothbury in London (centre), with the Bank of England on the left
- Type: Joint-stock
- Industry: Banking
- Founded: 10 March 1834; 192 years ago
- Defunct: 1 January 1970; 56 years ago
- Fate: Merger with National Provincial Bank
- Successor: National Westminster Bank
- Headquarters: 41 Lothbury, London EC2
- Subsidiaries: Ulster Bank Limited

Westminster Bank was a British retail bank which operated in England and Wales. It was created in 1834 as the London and Westminster Bank. It merged with the London and County Bank in 1909, after which it renamed itself the London County and Westminster Bank, then acquired the former business of Birkbeck Bank in 1911, Ulster Bank in 1917, and Parr's Bank in 1918, following which it changed its name again to London County Westminster and Parrs. It shortened its name to Westminster Bank in 1923.

Following that transformative sequence of acquisitions, Westminster Bank was the fifth-largest bank in England, thus one of the so-called Big Five together with Barclays, Lloyds Bank, Midland Bank, and National Provincial Bank. In 1968 it announced its merger with National Provincial to form the National Westminster Bank, which was completed on 1 January 1970.

== History ==
=== London and Westminster Bank ===
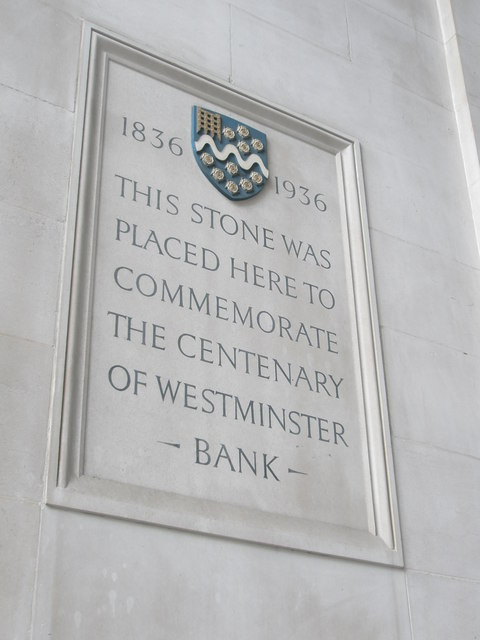
Commemorative centenary stone placed at Lothbury, London in 1936

In 1834, the London and Westminster Bank was the first firm founded under the auspices of the Bank Charter Act 1833, which allowed joint-stock banks to be established in the capital. For various reasons, the press, private banking concerns, and the Bank of England were so hostile to the Bank Charter Act that London and Westminster's management was primarily concerned with defending the company's right to exist rather than setting up an extensive branch network. As a result, the bank opened only six London branches in its first three years and no additional offices were established until nearly 20 years later.

London and Westminster made its first acquisition in 1847, when it bought Young & Son. In about 1870 it acquired Unity Joint-Stock Bank, and mergers with Commercial Bank of London and Middlesex Bank had been arranged in 1861 and 1863 respectively. By 1909 London and Westminster had opened or acquired 37 branches in and around London. Yet, despite this expansion effort, the bank felt the effects of competition from provincial peers like Lloyds Bank and Midland Bank. These two banks had already established large regional branch networks and were quickly encroaching upon the London market.

=== London and County Bank ===
The Surrey, Kent and Sussex Banking Company had been established at Southwark in 1836 and soon had branches in places like Croydon, Brighton, Maidstone and Woolwich. It was renamed the London and County Banking Co. in 1839. By 1875 it had over 150 branches and was the largest British bank. London and County took over the business of the following banks:

Date	Acquisition	Established
1839	Jeffreys & Hill, Chatham	1811
1841	Hopkins, Drewett & Co., Arundel	1827
1841	Hector, Lacy & Co., Petersfield	1808
1841	Ridge & Co., Chichester	c.1783
1841	Halford, Baldock & Co., Canterbury	c.1790
1841	Emmerson, Hodgson & Emmerson, Sandwich	c.1800
1842	Davenport, Walker & Co., Oxford	1838
1843	Wilmshurst & Co., Cranbrook	1822
1844	T. & T. S. Chapman, Aylesbury	1837
1845	J. Stoveld & Co., Petworth	1806
1849	Trapp, Halfhead & Co., Bedford	1829
1851	Berkshire Union Banking Co., Newbury	1841
1853	Eddy & Squire, Berkhamsted	1851
1859	Western Bank of London	1856
1860	Robert Davies & Co., Shoreditch	1841
1870	Nunn & Co., Manningtree	1810
1888	Vallance & Payne, Sittingbourne	1800
1891	Hove Banking Co. Ltd.	1876
1907	Frederick Burt & Co., Cornhill (foreign bankers)	1872

In 1909, London and Westminster Bank merged with London and County Bank, which by then had seventy offices citywide and almost two hundred in rural counties.

=== Birkbeck Bank ===
Birkbeck Building and Freehold Land Society, formed in 1851, developed a large deposit-taking business that developed into banking activity. Cheque books were issued from 1858, and by 1872 the business was trading under the title of Birkbeck Bank. In 1910, when its balance sheet totalled £12.26 million and it had 112,817 accounts, the bank suffered a run. Continuing rumours about its financial position, and a climate of depreciation in gilt-edged securities, led to a suspension of payments. The Bank of England provided support for the immediate payment of 10 shillings in the pound to depositors, but as most of its deposits were held as long-term securities the bank lacked liquidity and went into receivership. In 1911, its goodwill and premises were purchased from the receiver by London County and Westminster Bank.

=== Overseas operations ===
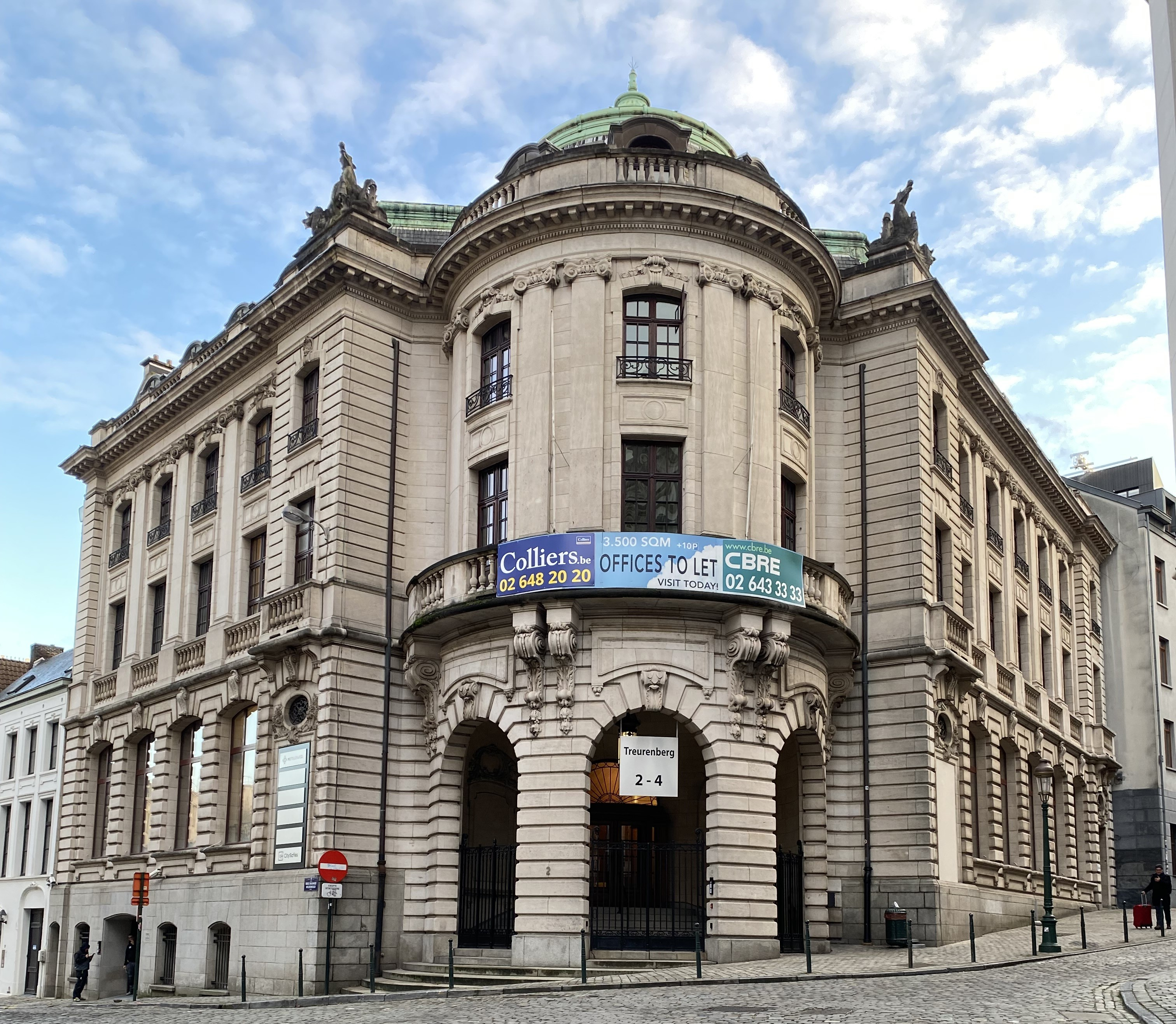
Former Westminster Bank building in Brussels, erected in 1920-1921

In 1913, the bank formed a subsidiary, London County and Westminster Bank (Paris), which opened branches during and after World War I in Bordeaux (1917), Lyon (1918), Marseille (1918) and Nantes (1919). The bank itself also directly established offices in Madrid (1917), Barcelona (1917), Antwerp (1919), Brussels (1919), Bilbao (1919) and Valencia (1920). These operations were converted into a foreign bank in 1920 and renamed London County Westminster and Parrs Foreign Bank, becoming Westminster Foreign Bank in 1923 and finally International Westminster Bank in 1973. All the Spanish branches were closed in 1923–24, due to deteriorating economic conditions in Spain and discrimination against foreign banks. Control of the remaining branches was exercised from London, although between 1940 and 1944 contact with them was lost due to the German occupation.

=== Subsequent developments ===
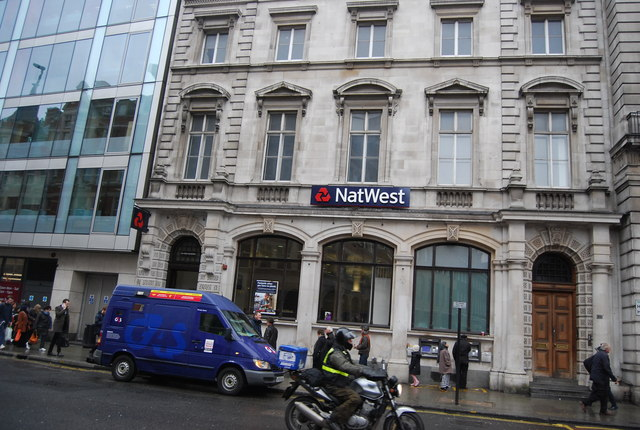
Former head office of Parr's Bank, 214 High Holborn in London

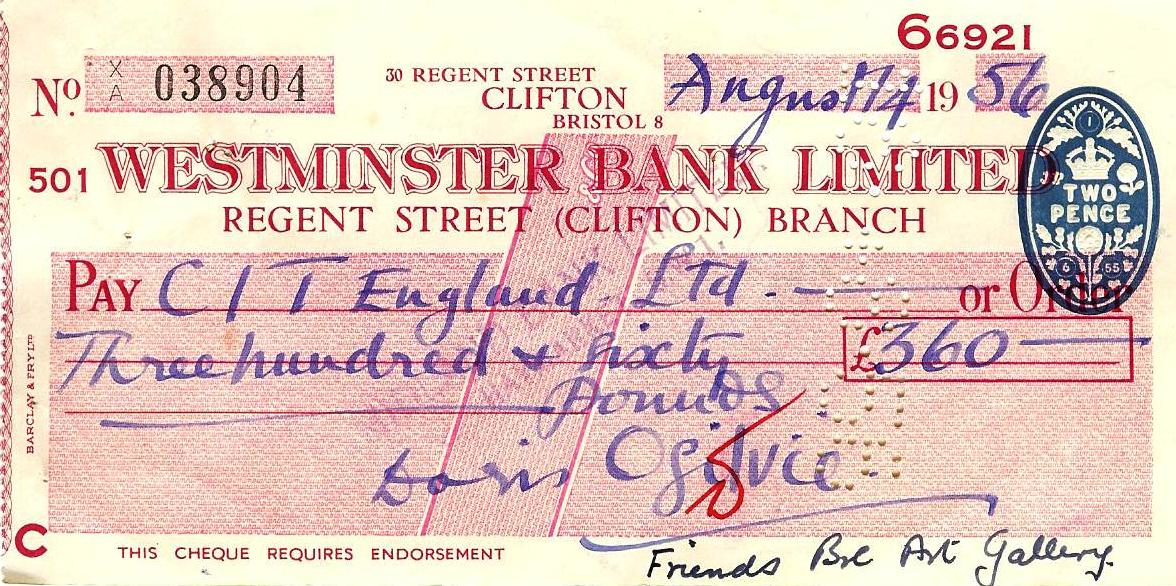
A 1956 cheque drawn on the Regent Street (Clifton) branch of Westminster Bank in Bristol

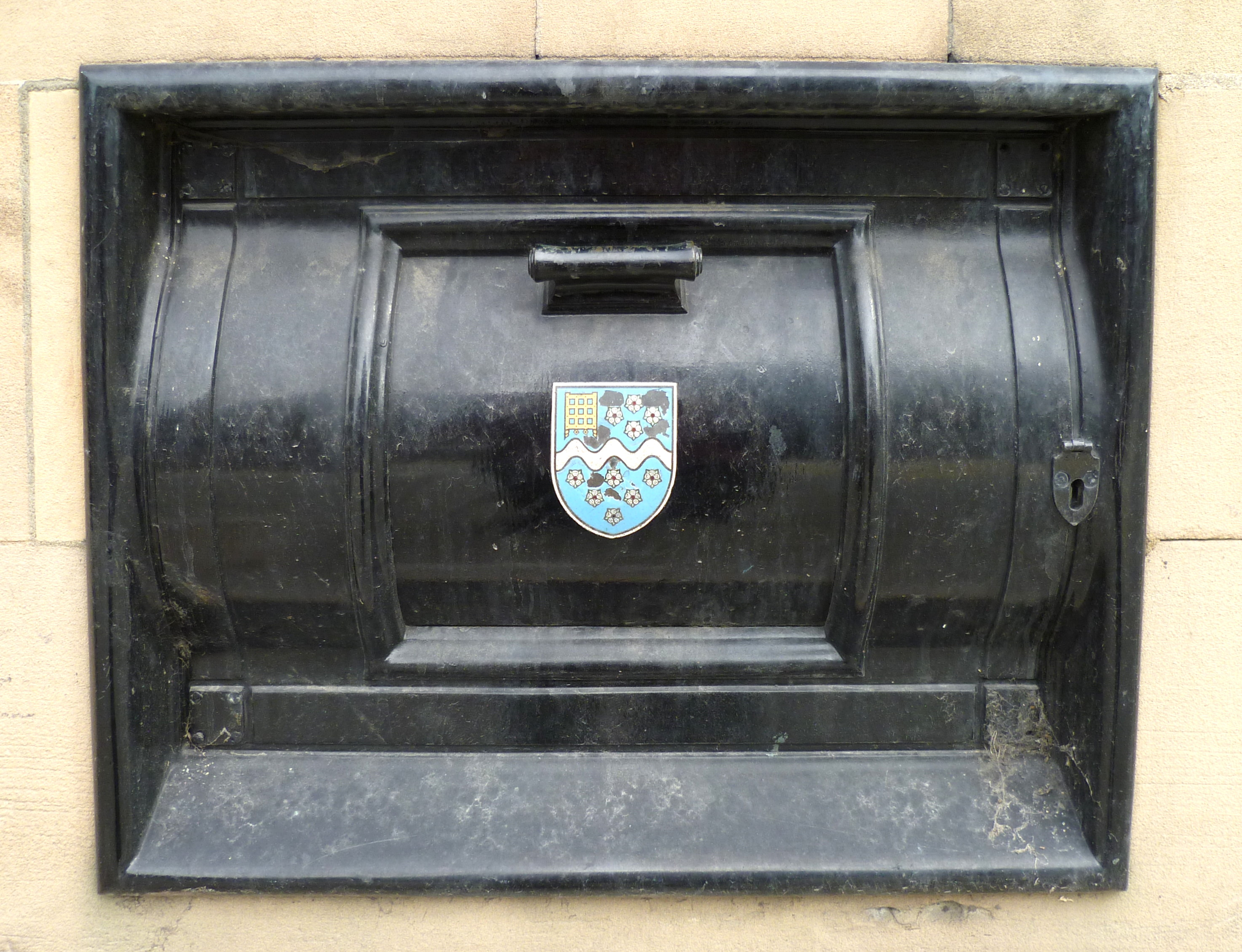
A Westminster Bank night safe at Station Road, New Barnet

In 1917, bank officials decided to acquire the Ulster Bank (which continued to operate separately), with 170 branches throughout Ireland, and in 1918 bought Parr's Bank, with over 320 offices throughout England. The Parr's name survives in the Bloomsbury, Parr's Branch of National Westminster Bank at 214 High Holborn, London.

During the economic difficulties of the late 1920s and early 1930s, the bank kept tight centralised control over the continental branch of the business to avoid the dangers of too rapid an expansion in unfamiliar markets, but this policy stunted Westminster's international operations. It did mean that the bank escaped the bad debts and currency fluctuations that plagued many other banks between the world wars, allowing the domestic side of the business to grow steadily. The bank continued to expand through acquisition, namely:

Date	Acquisition	Established
1919	Nottingham & Nottinghamshire Banking Co. Ltd.	1834
1921	Beckett & Co., Leeds and York	1774
1923	Stilwell & Sons, London	1774
1924	Guernsey Commercial Banking Co. Ltd.	1835

Paid-up capital rose from £9 million in 1923 to £40.5 million in 1935. By 1939 there were 1,100 branches and at the time of the merger with National Provincial Bank in 1968, Westminster had 1,400 branches in England alone.

=== Merger and legacy ===
The merger of Westminster and National Provincial Bank, announced in early 1968, shocked the British public and banking community. Although the Bank of England had indicated a willingness to allow mergers as part of a rationalisation process, no one had seriously believed it would permit mergers among the largest and most influential banks.

The District Bank (a 1962 National Provincial acquisition), National Provincial and Westminster Bank were fully integrated in the new firm's structure, while Coutts & Co. (a 1920 National Provincial acquisition), Ulster Bank and the Isle of Man Bank (a 1961 National Provincial acquisition) continued as separate operations. Duncan Stirling, chairman of Westminster Bank, became first chairman of the fifth-largest bank in the world. The statutory process of integration was completed in 1969 and the new company, National Westminster Bank, opened its doors for business on 1 January 1970.

The Westminster Bank continued to exist as a dormant registered non-trading company until 4 July 2017 when it was dissolved.

== Branding ==
The portcullis used by the bank was one of the familiar badges of King Henry VII and derived from the arms of the royal City of Westminster, which also included the fess wavy, signifying the River Thames, derived from the arms of the County of London. The present National Westminster Bank continues to use the portcullis in its common seal (the official seal kept in accordance with section 40 of the Companies Act).

== See also ==
- Westminster (typeface)

== Bibliography ==
- Ashby, J. F. The Story of the Banks Hutchinson & Co., London, 1934
- Gregory, T. E. The Westminster Bank Through a Century Oxford University Press, 1936
- Mottram, R. H. The Westminster Bank 1836–1936 Westminster Bank, London, 1936
- Reed, Richard National Westminster Bank: A Short History National Westminster Bank, London, 1989
