= Midland Bank =

Company

Midland Bank plc
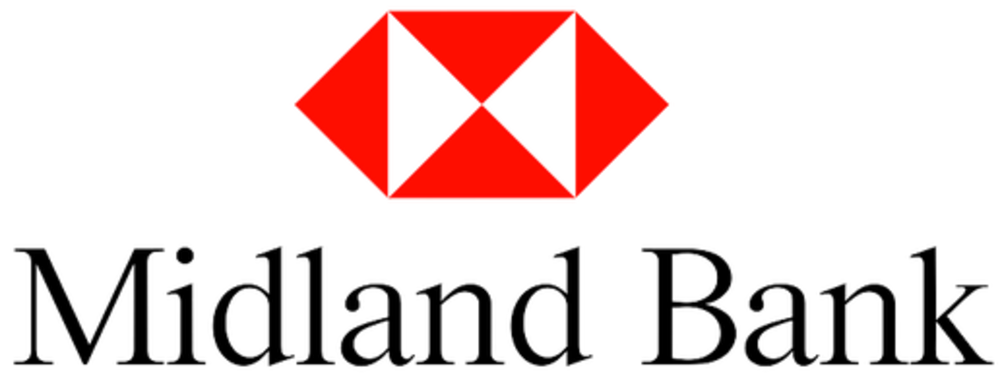

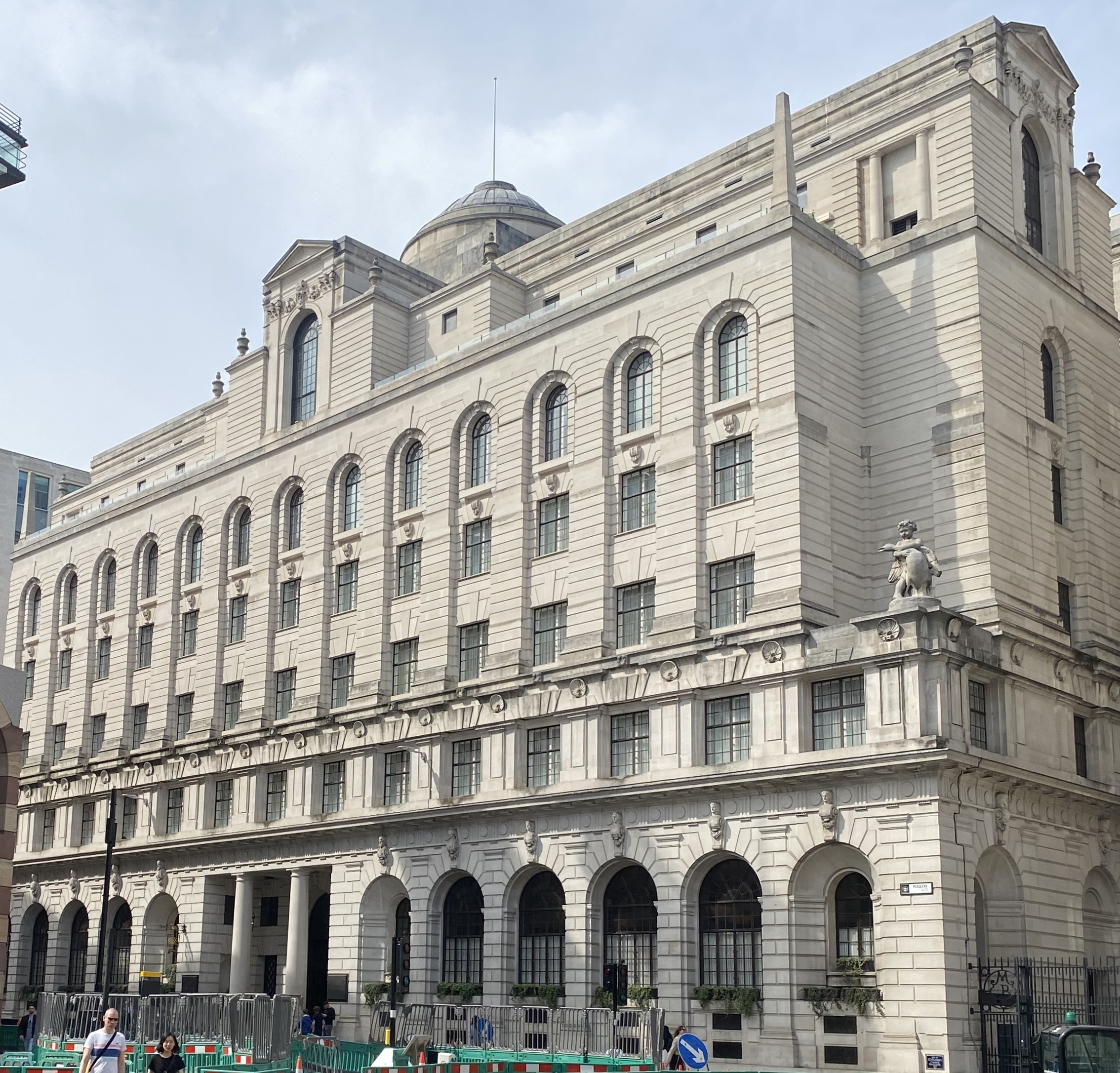
- Former head office at 27 Poultry, designed in 1924 by Edwin Lutyens and built in stages until 1939
- Company type: Public
- Industry: Financial services
- Predecessor: North of Scotland Bank
- Founded: 22 August 1836
- Defunct: June 1999
- Fate: Acquired by HSBC and renamed under its brand
- Successor: HSBC UK
- Headquarters: 27 Poultry, London
- Products: Banking and insurance
- Parent: HSBC
- Website: midlandbank.co.uk archive

Midland Bank plc was one of the Big Four banking groups in the United Kingdom for most of the 20th century. It is now part of HSBC. The bank was founded as the Birmingham and Midland Bank in Union Street, Birmingham, England in August 1836. It expanded in the Midlands, absorbing many local banks, and merged with the Central Bank of London in 1891, becoming the London City and Midland Bank.

After a period of nationwide expansion, including the acquisition of many smaller banks, the name Midland Bank Ltd was adopted in 1923. By 1934, it was the largest deposit bank in the world. It was listed on the London Stock Exchange, and was once a constituent of the FTSE 100 Index, but in June 1992, it was taken over by HSBC Holdings plc, which phased out the Midland Bank name by June 1999 in favour of HSBC Bank.

On 10 June 2015, HSBC announced that it would be rebranding its branches in the United Kingdom. HSBC chairman Douglas Flint described the Midland brand as "odds on favourite" for a return to the high street. In September 2015, it was announced that the Midland Bank name would not be revived, and the branch network in the United Kingdom would be branded "HSBC UK".

== History ==
=== Early history ===
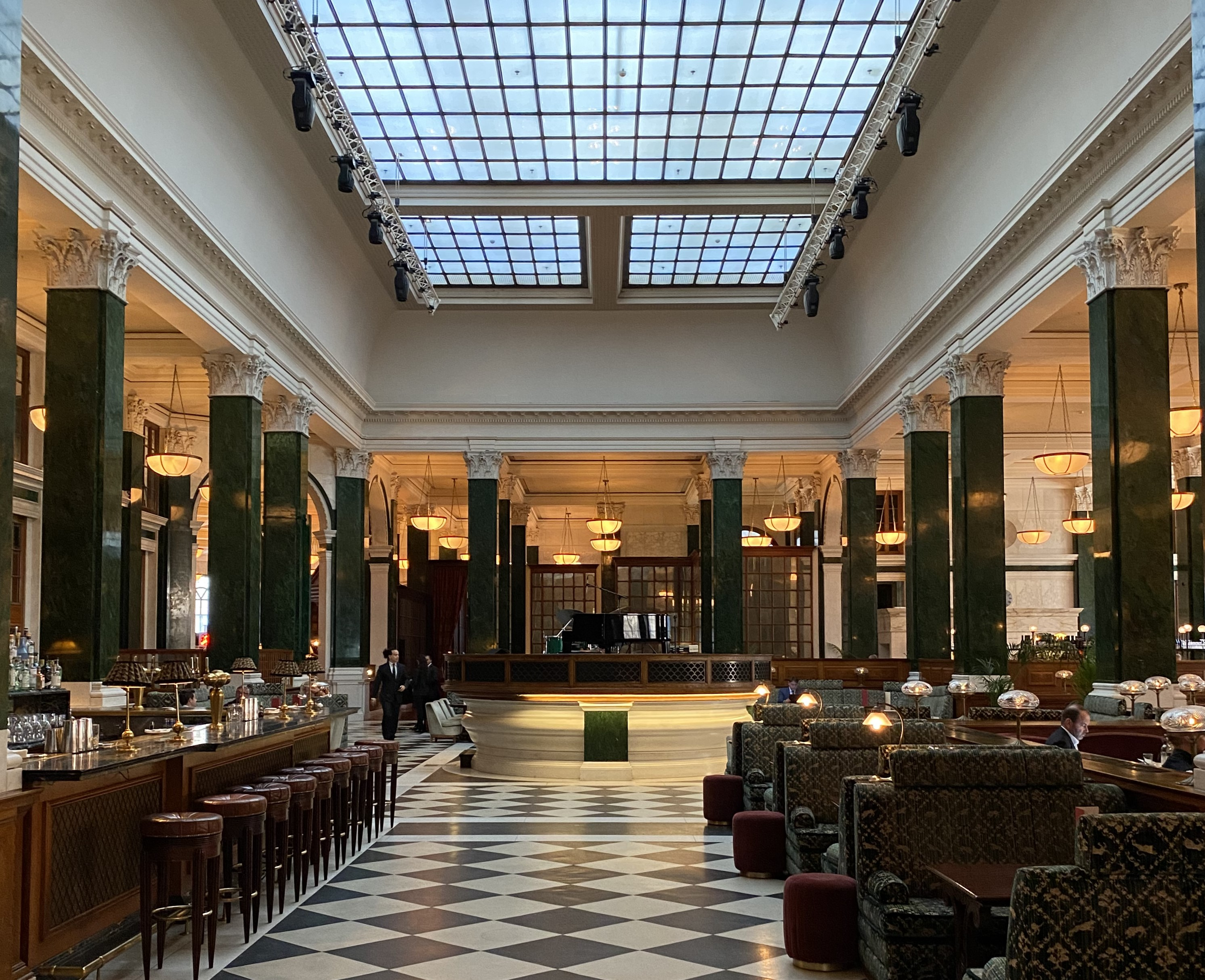
Midland Bank's head office banking hall at 27 Poultry, built in the late 1920s

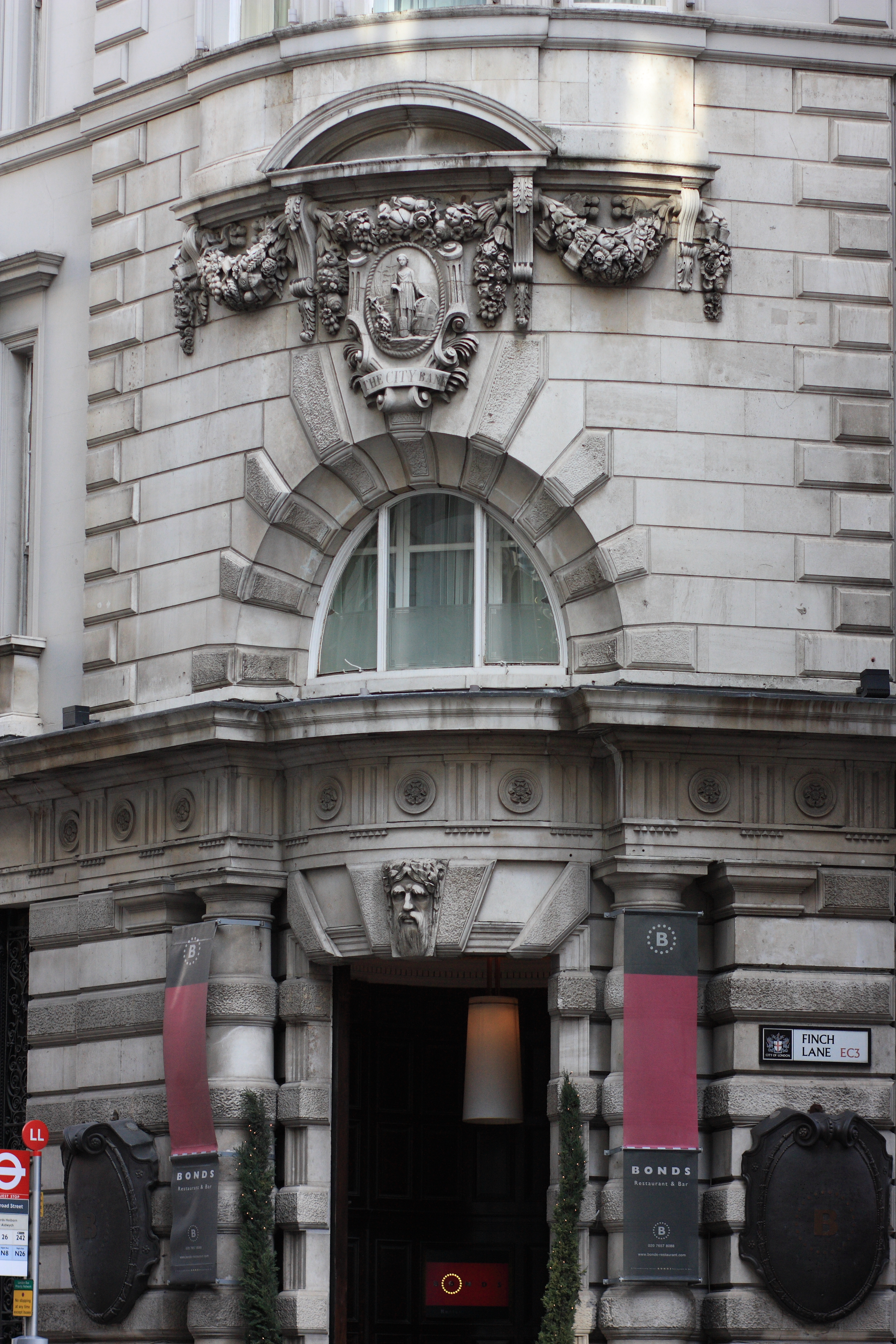
Former Threadneedle Street head office of The City Bank, which became London City and Midland Bank

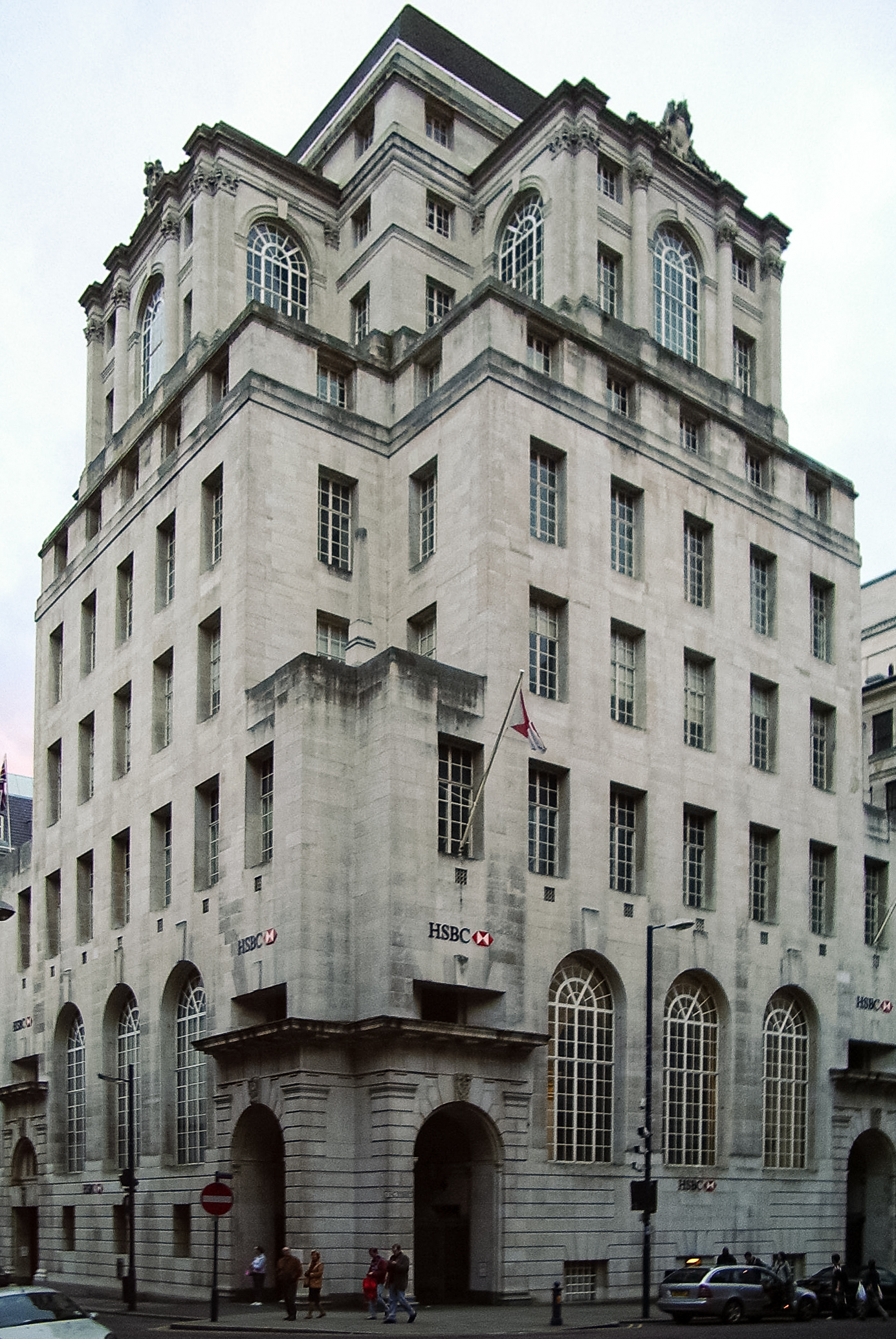
The Lutyens-designed 100 King Street, Manchester

Midland Bank was founded by Charles Geach, its first manager in Union Street, Birmingham, England, in August 1836. Geach had formerly worked at the Bank of England; he secured the business support and capital backing of leading merchants and manufacturers in Birmingham.

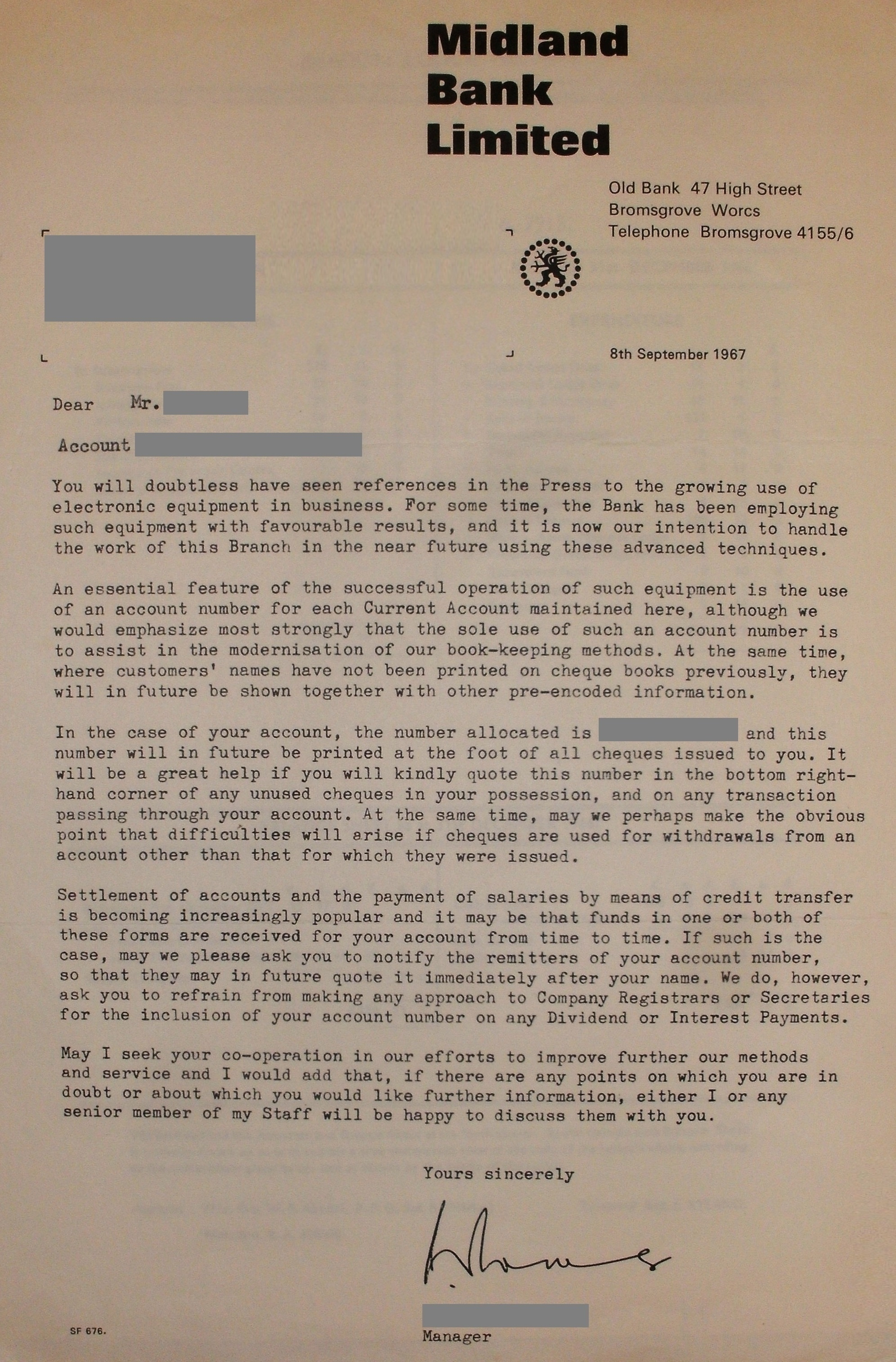
1967 letter telling a customer about the introduction of electronic data processing

In the 1830s and 1840s, Midland offered discounted bills of exchange for customers. By the 1850s the bank's customers included railways, iron founders and engineering concerns, utilities and municipal corporations.

Midland acquired Stourbridge Old Bank in 1851 and Nichols, Baker and Crane of Bewdley in 1862.

=== Acquisitions and development in its first 50 years ===
From the 1880s, it expanded its customer base by opening new branches and acquiring other banks. In 1891 it acquired the Central Bank of London (which gave Midland a seat in the London Bankers' Clearing House, in 1898 it bought the City Bank (which provided a London head office), in 1901 it acquired the Sheffield Union Bank, in 1913 the Sheffield and Hallamshire Bank and, in 1914, it acquired the Birmingham Banking Company.

By 1918, with deposits of £335 million, it ranked as the largest bank in the world. Edward Hopkinson Holden led the bank at this time first as managing director from 1898 to 1908 and then as chairman and managing director from 1908 until his death in 1919. He oversaw more than twenty bank amalgamations between 1891 and 1918, and opened new branches throughout England and Wales.

Holden also expanded overseas; it was the first British bank to set up a foreign exchange department and, by 1919, it was acting as London bank to some 650 correspondent banks throughout the world. From 1907, these correspondents included The Hongkong and Shanghai Banking Corporation.

After the First World War, the leading British banks entered an agreement with the government that they would not attempt further amalgamations without Treasury approval. As a result, Midland turned its attention to expanding its branch network, adding new banking services, mechanising its systems (from 1928) and advertising its activities.

=== Post-war recovery and international alliances ===
Midland responded to the ending of credit restrictions in 1958, by extending its branch network and by introducing a series of innovative services, including personal loans (1958), personal cheque accounts (1958) and cheque cards (1966). In 1958, it acquired Forward Trust, which became a leader in instalment finance, leasing and factoring services.

In 1967, Midland acquired a share in Montagu Trust, the owner of Samuel Montagu & Co., and thereby became the first British clearing bank to own a London merchant bank. Samuel Montagu, with its own history dating back to 1853, became a wholly owned subsidiary in 1974, and is now part of HSBC's private banking business.

Through the acquisition of Samuel Montagu & Co, Midland also gained a majority share in Guyerzeller Bank AG (now HSBC Guyerzeller Bank) in Switzerland. Further diversification followed in 1972, when Midland was the leading member of the consortium that acquired the Thomas Cook travel business. After becoming sole owner in 1977, Midland sold its interest in 1992.

In 1974, Midland began to open branches or representative offices in overseas countries and to acquire other international banks. The largest of these was the purchase of a majority share in Crocker National of California, United States: this was not a success and Midland was forced to take full ownership in 1985 so that it could sell it to Wells Fargo the following year.

Midland also needed additional capital and its solution to both challenges was to sell Clydesdale (along with Midland's Irish subsidiaries Northern Bank and National Irish Bank) to National Australia Bank in 1987. In 1980, Midland acquired a controlling interest in Trinkaus & Burkhardt KGaA, a private bank in Germany with a long history of its own, today HSBC Trinkaus.

In 1984, in a bid to increase market share Midland scrapped current account charges. It was so successful that all other banks in the United Kingdom had to quickly follow and offer the same or risk losing their customers. The country has had free banking ever since.

=== Midland joins the HSBC Group ===
The Hongkong and Shanghai Banking Corporation acquired a 14.9% equity interest in Midland Bank in 1987, and a strong working relationship developed. In October 1989, First Direct was established and was at the forefront of telephone banking, with person to person service available twenty four hours a day, 365 days a year.

In June 1992, following a brief bidding war with Lloyds Bank, HSBC Holdings plc acquired full ownership of Midland Bank. At the time, it was one of the largest acquisitions in banking history, and gave HSBC a major foothold in Europe, which it needed to complement its existing business in Asia and the Americas, when it had to move its Hong Kong–based headquarters to London on 1 January 1993, accepting primary banking supervision by the Bank of England.

In 1997, Midland Bank underwent a total rebrand to match its parent company, with its familiar griffin logo being dropped after 32 years in favour of the HSBC "hexagon" symbol, albeit with the "Midland Bank" name placed next to it. Midland Bank was renamed HSBC Bank in June 1999, as part of the adoption of the HSBC brand throughout the Group. Prior to this, a Midland Bank branch in Croydon became the first to bear the HSBC name in the UK, albeit with "Midland Bank plc" still featuring on the plaque near the entrance.

The last head office of Midland Bank, opposite the Bank of England in Poultry and Princes Street, was sold in October 2006 to a tycoon from Russia, with HSBC vacating the banking hall on the ground floor and huge underground deposit vaults in 2007. In 2012 the ground floor was used in the Channel 4 game show The Bank Job. The architect John Alfred Gotch designed the building, with assistance from Sir Edwin Lutyens.

Built between 1921 and 1939, and symbol of the 1930s pride of the biggest bank in the world, the building is now The Ned Hotel City of London.

Until around 2020, the HSBC UK SWIFT code (all offices in the United Kingdom) remained MIDLGB22, reflecting its past as the Midland Bank.

== Branding ==
Midland Bank was famous for its golden griffin logo, surrounded by golden coins originally introduced in 1965 on a black, then later blue background, and for its slogan "the listening bank", written by the advertising executive Rod Allen. Advertisements for the bank appeared in the popular computer game Theme Park. An animated friendly version of the Griffin fronted the bank's television advertising during the 1980s.

Midland Bank still traded as Midland Bank, but started adopting an HSBC byline by the early 1990s, started using the HSBC logo from 1997, and was finally rebranded as HSBC Bank in June 1999, as part of the adoption of the HSBC brand throughout the group. However, a dormant subsidiary, Midland Bank (Branch Nominees) Limited, continues to be registered at Companies House.

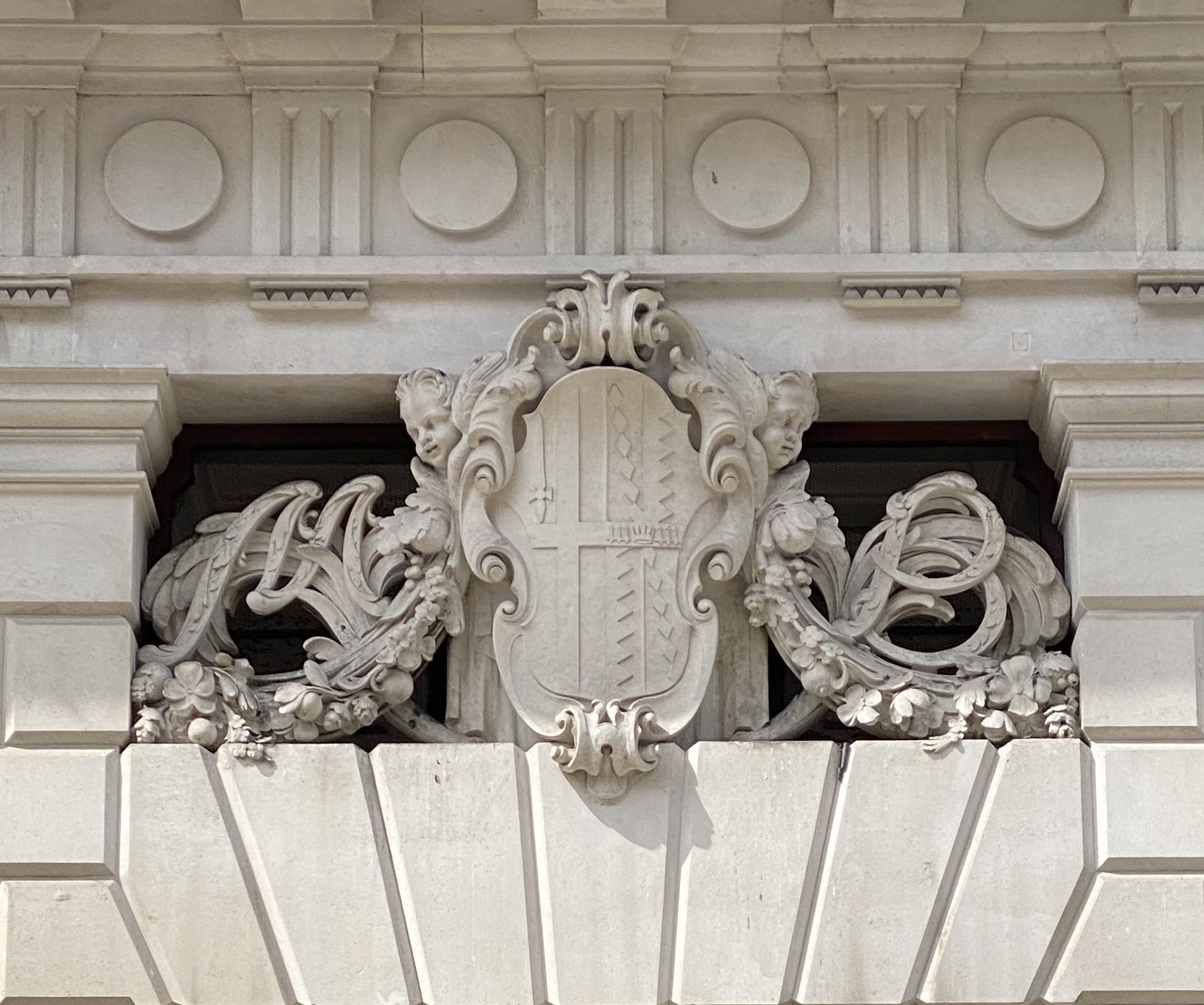
Coat of arms and initials of Midland Bank in the 1930s, above its side entrance on Princes Street, London

First "griffin" logo, used from 1957 to 1988

Second "griffin" logo used from 1988 to 1997

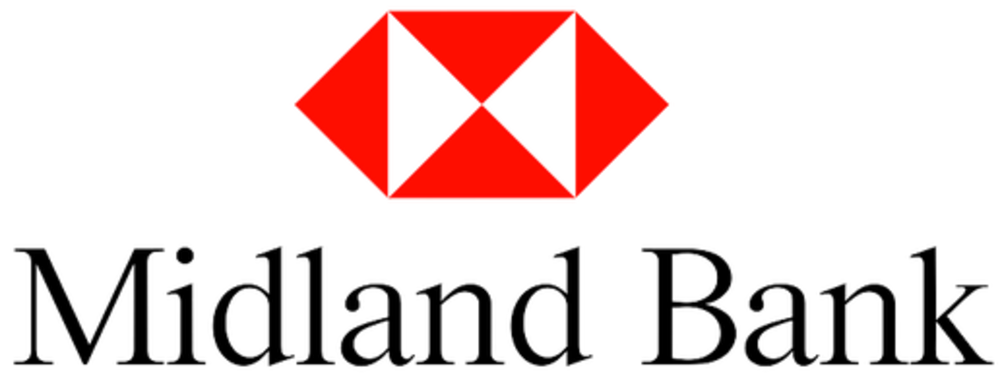
Final logo used from 1997 to 1999 (HSBC logo with "Midland Bank" name)
