= Nationalisation of Northern Rock =

Nationalisation of a UK bank in 2008

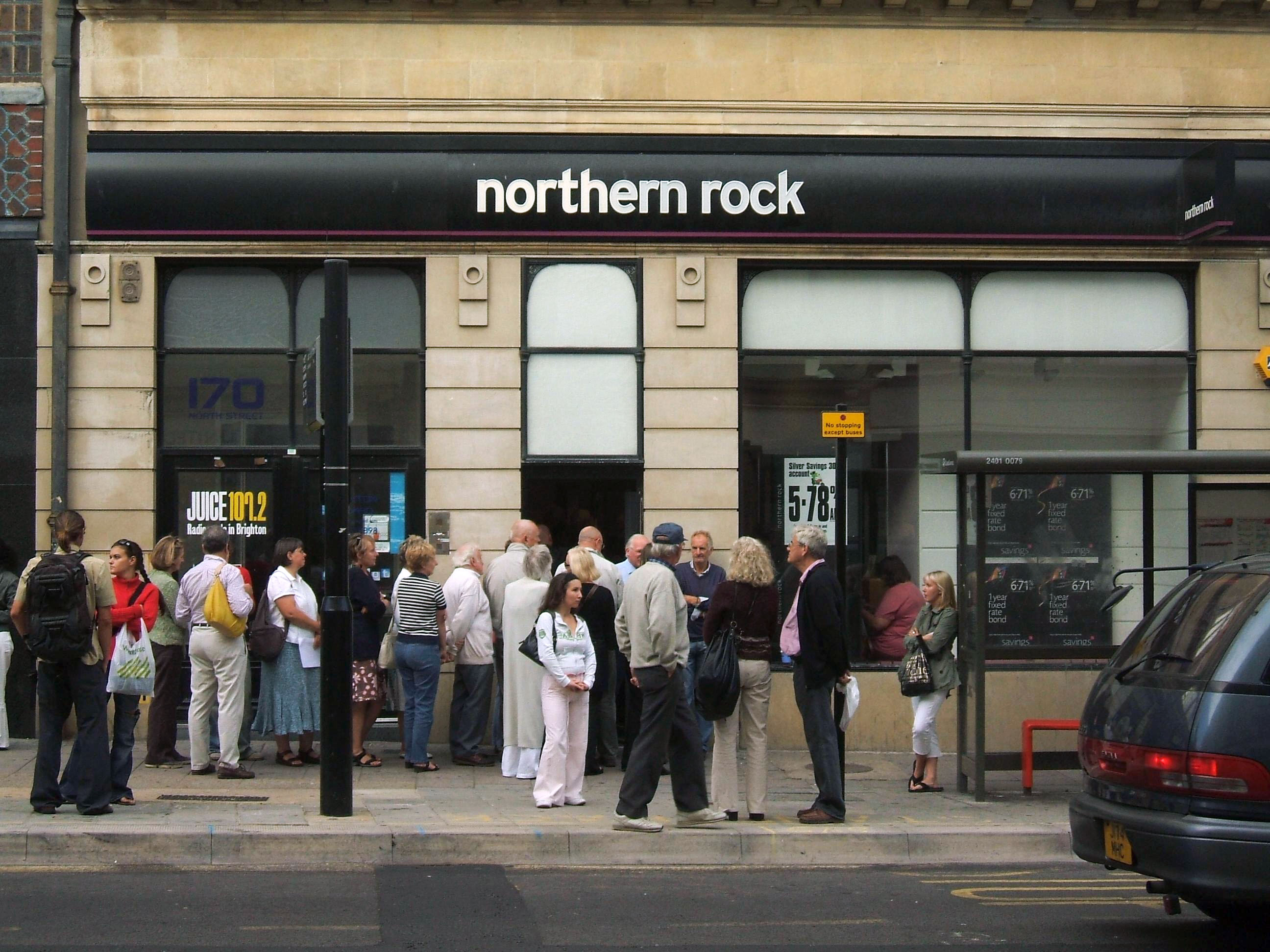
People queuing at a branch of the Northern Rock bank in Brighton on 14 September 2007.

In 2008 the Northern Rock bank was nationalised by the British government, due to financial problems caused by the subprime mortgage crisis. In 2010 the bank was split into two parts (assets and banking) to aid the eventual sale of the bank back to the private sector.

On 14 September 2007, the bank sought and received a liquidity support facility from the Bank of England, as a result of its exposure in the credit markets, during the 2008 financial crisis. On 22 February 2008 the bank was taken into state ownership. The nationalisation followed two unsuccessful bids to take over the bank, neither being able to fully commit to repayment of savers' and investors' money.

In 2012, Virgin Money completed the purchase of Northern Rock from UK Financial Investments (UKFI) for approximately £1 billion and by October of that year the high street bank operated under the Virgin Money brand.

== 2007 credit crisis ==
=== Emergence ===
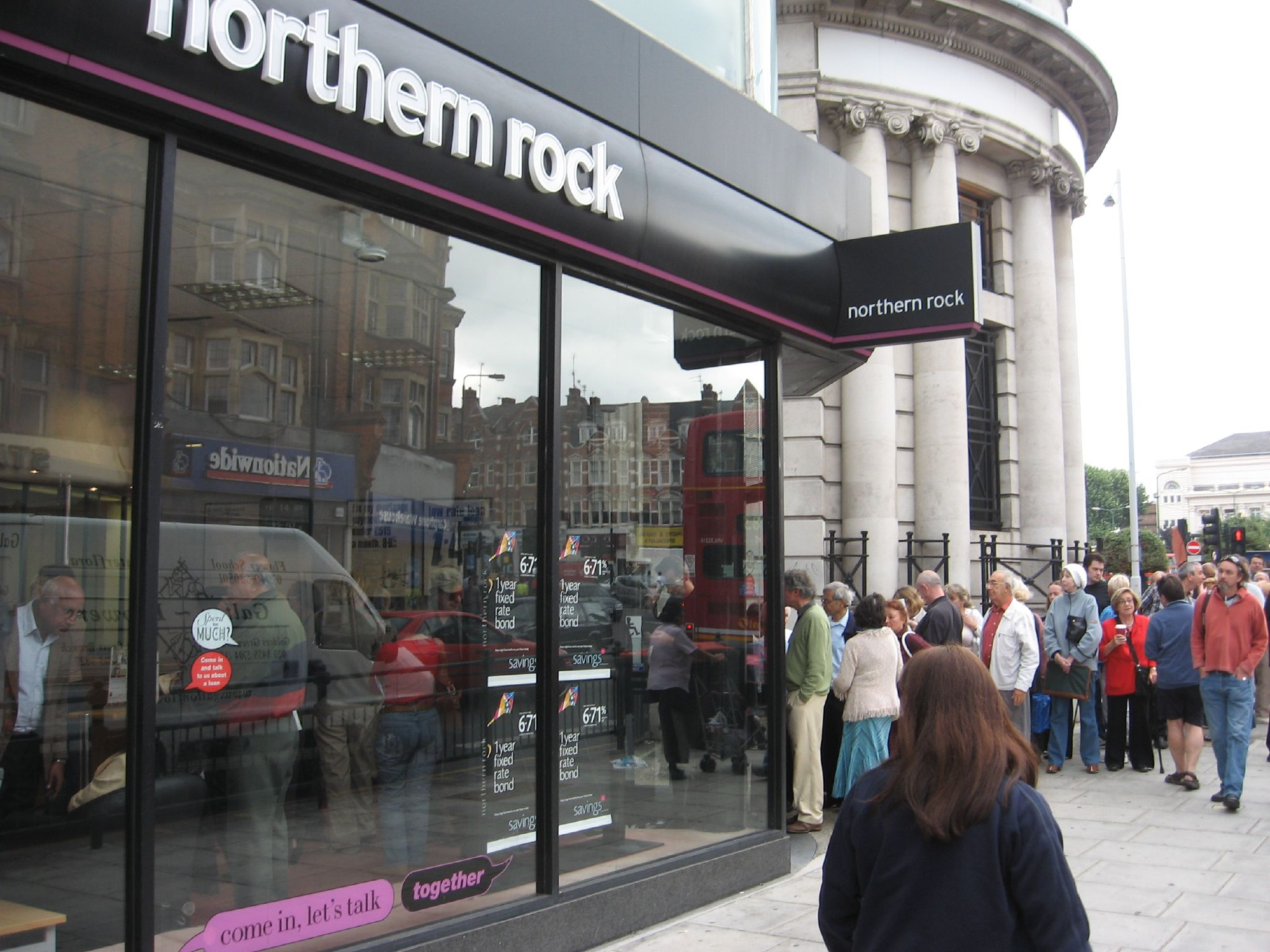
People queuing outside a branch in Golders Green to withdraw their savings due to fallout from the subprime crisis.

On 12 September 2007, Northern Rock asked the Bank of England, as lender of last resort in the United Kingdom, for a liquidity support facility due to problems in raising funds in the money market to replace maturing money market borrowings. The problems arose from difficulties banks faced over the summer of 2007 in raising funds in the money market. Despite Northern Rock appearing to be in a stronger position than other UK banks on paper, it faced a liquidity problem because institutional lenders became nervous about lending to mortgage banks following the US sub-prime crisis. Bank of England figures suggest that Northern Rock borrowed £3 billion from the Bank of England in the first few days of this crisis.

=== Government intervention ===
With shares in Northern Rock plummeting by nearly a third, the British Government moved to reassure investors with the bank, with account holders urged not to worry about the bank going bust. The Treasury select committee chairman John McFall MP said: "I don't think customers of Northern Rock should be worried about their current accounts or mortgages."

Northern Rock was not the only British bank to have called on the Bank of England for funds since the sub-prime crisis began but is the only one to have had emergency financial support from the Tripartite Authority (The Bank of England, the FSA and HM Treasury). However, the bank was more vulnerable to a credit crunch as its 'high risk' business model depended on funding from the wholesale credit markets, 75% of its funds coming from this source. In his address to the Treasury Select Committee, Bank of England governor Mervyn King had stated emergency funds would be made available to any British bank that needed it, but at a penalty rate, to ensure that lenders who had made bad lending decisions would suffer relative to lenders who had made sensible lending decisions.

In December, the EU regulators approved Britain's actions to provide aid to the bank by concluding that it was in line with European emergency aid rules.

=== Run on the bank ===
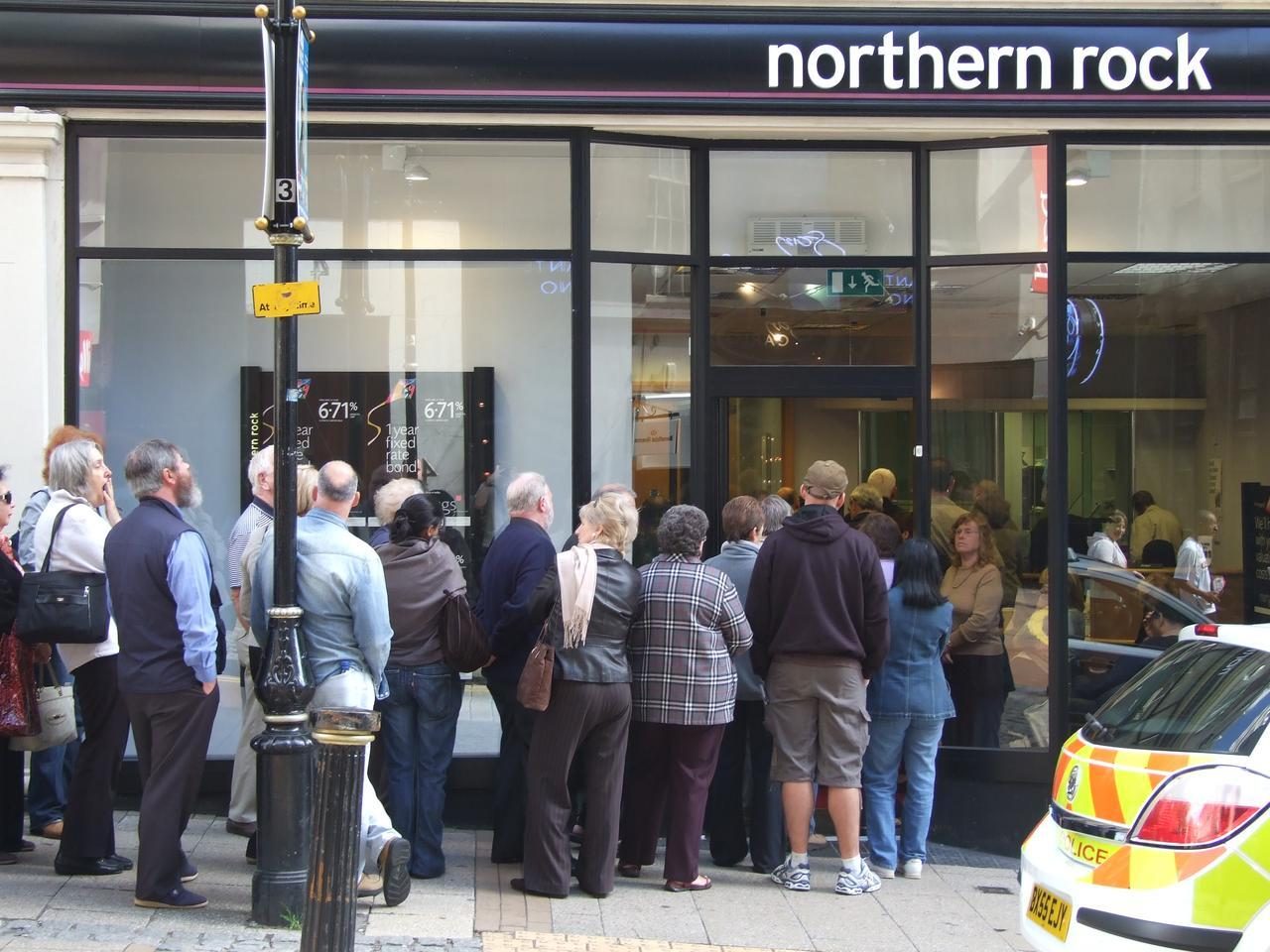
Outside a Northern Rock branch in Birmingham

On Friday 14 September 2007, the first day branches opened following the news, many customers queued outside branches to withdraw their savings (a run on the bank). This bank run was not the traditional form, where depositors withdraw money in a snowball effect, leading to a liquidity crisis; instead, it occurred in the aftermath of the liquidity crisis. It was estimated that £1 billion was withdrawn by customers that day, about 5% of the total bank deposits held by Northern Rock.

On Monday 17 September, as worried savers continued to flock to some Northern Rock bank branches to withdraw their savings, it was reported that an estimated £2 billion had been withdrawn since the bank applied to the Bank of England for emergency funds. By early afternoon in London, Northern Rock's shares, which had lost 32% on the previous Friday, fell a further 40% from 438 pence to 263 pence.

Later that day, the Chancellor of the Exchequer, Alistair Darling, announced that the British Government and the Bank of England would guarantee all deposits held at Northern Rock. Northern Rock shares rose by 16% after this was announced.

=== Stabilisation ===
The announcement by the chancellor showed its intended effects the next day, as the queues outside Northern Rock's branches gradually disappeared. In addition, Northern Rock had a series of advertisements published in major UK newspapers to reaffirm that their customers' money was safe.

In an interview on BBC Radio 4, Bank of England governor Mervyn King revealed that they had anticipated emergency funding to be in the £20–30bn range.

What we want to do is to give incentives for people to behave properly, so in judging the interest rate at which we lent to Northern Rock we asked ourselves the question: "At what interest rate would they have to pay in borrowing from us today that would make them regret not having taken out an insurance policy as Countrywide did before the 9th of August?"

— Bank of England governor, Mervyn King, BBC Radio 4 – File on 4

=== Boardroom changes ===
Matt Ridley was forced to resign as chairman in 2007, having been blamed in parliamentary committee hearings for not recognising the risks of the bank's financial strategy and thereby "harming the reputation of the British banking industry".

John Devaney and Simon Laffin joined the board in November 2007, when Sir Derek Wanless, Nichola Pease, Adam Fenwick and Rosemary Radcliffe retired as non-executive directors. The chief executive, Adam Applegarth, stayed on in a caretaker role until December 2007. David Baker and Keith Currie left the board, but remained employed within the company. Currie later took early retirement with a bonus package reportedly worth £2.5 million, and in 2012, aged 56, was found dead at his home.

The chief executive after the departure of Applegarth was Andy Kuipers, who joined the company in 1987, and later left on 31 August 2008.

=== Growth of Bank of England loan ===
By January 2008, Northern Rock's loan from the Bank of England had grown to £26bn. On 11 January, Northern Rock announced that it had sold its portfolio of lifetime home equity release mortgages to JP Morgan for £2.2bn and that it would use this to pay off a piece of the Bank of England loan.

On 6 February, the Office for National Statistics announced that it was treating Northern Rock as a public corporation, similar to the BBC and Royal Mail for accounting purposes, causing the loans (approximately £25 billion) and guarantees (approximately £30 billion) extended by the Bank of England and the value of the company's mortgage book (approximately £55 billion), provisionally estimated to total around £100 billion, to be added to the National Debt. Although not technically a nationalisation, the decision effectively acknowledged that "In all but name, Northern Rock is now nationalised".

The addition of this borrowing to the government's totals increased the National Debt from £537 billion, or 37.7% of GDP to around 45%, breaking the so-called Golden Rule which sets the Public Sector Borrowing Requirement threshold at below 40%. The figure is the equivalent of £3,000 additional borrowing for every family in Britain. In the 2008 Budget, the Chancellor of the Exchequer announced that the government would issue £14 billion of gilts in order to cover the Northern Rock debt.

=== Handling of the crisis ===
On 26 March the Financial Services Authority released an internal report into the failings over handling the problems at Northern Rock. "They found that their supervision of the bank had not been carried out to a standard that is acceptable". The previous FSA review had taken place in February 2006. In the light of these failings at Northern Rock, the FSA announced that they would overhaul their own staffing and systems. The FSA internal report also concluded that ultimately the blame for the collapse of Northern Rock should rest with the bank's senior management. "The boards and managements of regulated firms carry the primary responsibility for ensuring their institutions' financial soundness," the FSA said. The British Bankers' Association (BBA), the UK banking body, agreed.

In May 2009 the Financial Times reported that banking regulators had been examining "war games" as early as 2004, which dealt with possible turmoil in the mortgage markets. HBOS and Northern Rock are thought to have featured in these predictions.

Commencing in October 2007, the All Party Commons Treasury Select Committee undertook a report into the failure of Northern Rock. The committee held several televised meetings, in which they called witnesses from the former Board of Northern Rock, the Bank of England, the Treasury and the regulatory bodies. The report was detailed, and concluded:

"The [former] directors of Northern Rock were the principal authors of the difficulties that the company has faced since August 2007. It is right that members of the Board of Northern Rock have been replaced, though haphazardly, since the company became dependent on liquidity support from the Bank of England. The high-risk, reckless business strategy of Northern Rock, with its reliance on short- and medium-term wholesale funding and an absence of sufficient insurance and a failure to arrange standby facility or cover that risk, meant that it was unable to cope with the liquidity pressures placed upon it by the freezing of international capital markets in August 2007. Given that the formulation of that strategy was a fundamental role of the Board of Northern Rock, overseen by some directors who had been there since its demutualisation, the failure of that strategy must also be attributed to the Board. The non-executive members of the Board, and in particular the Chairman of the Board, the Chairman of the Risk Committee and the senior non-executive director, failed in the case of Northern Rock to ensure that it remained liquid as well as solvent, to provide against the risks that it was taking and to act as an effective restraining force on the strategy of the executive members."

=== Financial performance ===
Northern Rock share price 2005–2008, showing the huge fall in price

Prior to the subprime mortgage crisis the bank was part of the FTSE 100 Index, but was demoted back to the FTSE 250 in December 2007. The shares were later delisted.

On 31 March the bank released its annual report for 2007, it showed a loss of £167 million. The former boss, Adam Applegarth received a £760,000 (£63,333 a month) payoff. The report also outlined further details of their proposed business plan.

On 5 August the bank announced that it had made a loss of £585.4m for the first 6 months of the year and that £9.4bn of a loan from the Bank of England had been paid back, reducing the amount owed to £17.5bn.

== Takeover offers ==
=== Virgin ===
On 12 October 2007, Virgin Group announced that it intended to bid for Northern Rock as the lead partner in a coalition including American giant AIG, turnaround specialist WL Ross and First Eastern Investment. Had the deal been successful, Northern Rock would have been integrated into Virgin Money as Virgin Bank.

It is unclear what role partners would have had in the deal. This bid was later approved by HM Treasury and had been noted as the preferred option. Virgin announced that Peter McNamara, a former Alliance & Leicester managing director, would be responsible for risk management at Northern Rock if its bid succeeds.

=== Other bidders ===
The other front-runner was an investment company Olivant, headed by the former chief executive of Abbey, Luqman Arnold. Olivant would have kept the Northern Rock brand. By 17 November, a total of ten companies had put forward proposals for the bank. Among the other suitors for Northern Rock were private equity firm Cerberus, JC Flowers and Lloyds TSB. In early December JC Flowers dropped out of the bidding.

=== Bids rejection ===
Northern Rock announced that all offers had been "materially below" the previous trading value. Alistair Darling said on 19 November that the Government would have to approve or veto any sale, in the interests of taxpayers, depositors and wider financial stability.

=== Possible nationalisation ===
In December the government prepared emergency legislation to nationalise the bank, in the event that the takeover bids fail. On 12 January 2008, the Treasury recruited Ron Sandler, the former Lloyd's of London Chief Executive, to lead Northern Rock, in the event that the bank was nationalised. If the bank was to be temporarily nationalised, the government would manage the bank at "arm's length" on a commercial basis, where services for savers and borrowers would not be affected and the company would continue to operate as normal. However nationalisation would also address the future of the Northern Rock Foundation. Alistair Darling rejected the possibility of the bank being put into administration.

=== In-house proposal ===
On 15 December, Northern Rock hired the bank Goldman Sachs to put together a financing package, to assemble backers and present proposals to its board. This package would be available to any potential bidder for the bank. The in-house bid was led by Paul Thompson and Andy Kuipers.

=== Final bids ===
The deadline for bids was 4 February 2008, where final bids were expected from Virgin, Olivant and the bank's management; other bidders could still have expressed interest. Goldman Sachs were likely to contact Cerberus and JC Flowers to see if they would like to rejoin the bidding, since the situation had materially changed. Once a successful proposal had been chosen, it would be put to the European Commission by 17 March, which would consider whether it conformed to EU state aid rules. Olivant pulled out of the bidding (but stated that they might still attempt a rescue bid if the Government changed their conditions) on 4 February, leaving just the Virgin bid and the in-house bid.

For repayment of the Government loans, there was a proposal to create an 'asset pool' at the bank, of a size greater than the loans. The bidder would have issued bonds against this asset pool, with maturities set inline with the repayment. Proceeds from the bond issue would have also gone to the Government and the bank would have paid for a government guarantee for the bonds to trade in the market at or near prices of similar gilt-edged stocks. This would have replaced the original plan for the bidders to have to find their own investors to cover the first £15bn, which proved impossible, due to the credit crunch. The government would also continue to guarantee the bank's liabilities, such as savers' deposits.

== Nationalisation ==
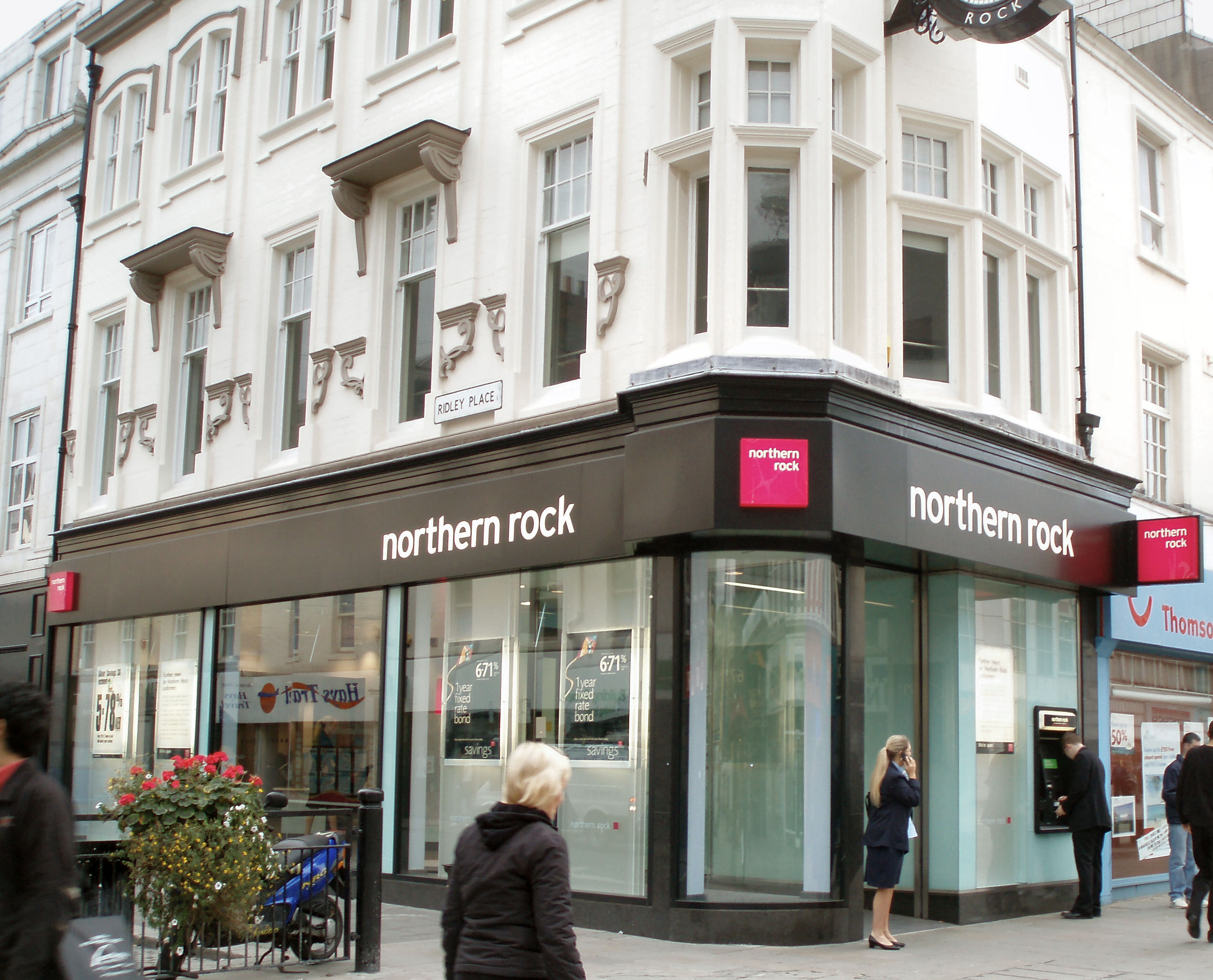
A typical Northern Rock branch, on Northumberland Street, Newcastle upon Tyne. Images of this branch and the clock above featured heavily in news stories about the bank's nationalisation.

On 17 February 2008, Alistair Darling, the Chancellor of the Exchequer, announced that Northern Rock was to be nationalised claiming that the private bids did not offer "sufficient value for money to the taxpayer" and thus the bank was to be brought under a "temporary period of public ownership".

The government was the sole shareholder through UK Financial Investments, and the bank was managed at "arm's length" on a commercial basis by an independent board under Ron Sandler. Customers were not affected by this change.

An arbitration panel was appointed by the Government to decide on a fair price for the compensation to be offered to investors for their shares. Prior to the markets opening on 18 February, trading in Northern Rock's ordinary and preference shares on the London Stock Exchange was suspended. The legal authorisation for the nationalisation is the Banking (Special Provisions) Act 2008, which also allows for the nationalisation of other banks if necessary. At 00:01 on 22 February Northern Rock was formally nationalised.

In November 2008 the government set up a new company, UK Financial Investments, to manage their shareholdings in Northern Rock and Bradford & Bingley. On 10 March 2009 the Office of Fair Trading published their report on the impacts of public support for Northern Rock on competition in financial services. The OFT concluded that "public support for Northern Rock did not, during that period, have a significantly adverse impact on competition."

=== Boardroom changes ===
In February 2008, Ron Sandler was appointed executive chairman by the government. Bryan Sanderson, Sir Ian Gibson, David Jones and Paul Thompson resigned from the board at this time. Gary Hoffman became chief executive of Northern Rock in October 2008. He has previously been the vice chairman of Barclays and a former managing director of Barclaycard. With the appointment of Gary Hoffman, Ron Sandler changed to a non-executive chairman position. On 4 November 2010 Hoffman left the bank to move to NBNK Investments; Sandler reverted to his executive chairman position.

In October 2008, the post-nationalisation management of Northern Rock decided not to bring legal action for negligence against the directors in charge during the crisis, including former chief executive Adam Applegarth, citing insufficient grounds to do so. There would be no action either against the auditors, PricewaterhouseCoopers.

In January 2009 it was announced that Ann Godbehere would be leaving her post as chief financial officer at the end of February.

Some former directors of the bank were fined and banned by the FSA including former deputy chief executive David Baker £504,000 for misreporting mortgage arrears data and former credit director Richard Barclay was fined £140,000 for failing to ensure accurate financial information. In April 2010, finance director David Jones quit the bank after reports that the FSA were to further investigate the activities at the bank prior to the nationalisation. That July Jones was fined and banned by the FSA.

=== Offshore mortgage book ===
It subsequently became known that the best book of Northern Rock's mortgage business, comprising mortgages worth £47 billion – some 40% of the company's assets – had been transferred to a Channel Islands based company called Granite, together with an ongoing obligation to continue to supply business. Failure to maintain the arrangement could cost a reported £5 billion. As is common practice in bank securitisations, Granite was set up as a charitable trust with any residue on winding-up to benefit a small charity, Down's Syndrome North East. Despite having assets worth an estimated £45 billion, Granite has never made a donation to the charity because it remains in business.

At Northern Rock's heart is Granite, a £45bn securitisation vehicle though which mortgages are parcelled up and sold to investors. Under 'substitution clauses' in Granite, investors can call in their loans if maturing mortgages are not replaced with new ones.

Should the clauses be triggered, investors could demand their funding back – potentially leaving the Government with an immediate £45bn bill. At the moment, only £25bn of taxpayer's money has actually gone into Northern Rock, through Bank of England loans. The rest of the support is via state guarantees, which the Treasury would prefer are not drawn upon.

'Granite is the reason the Government opted for nationalisation and did not put it into administration,' one senior Northern Rock insider said. Administration would also have triggered the clause.

Granite matures in tranches, with roughly £5bn expected to come up this year and £10bn next. As the Government regains control of the vehicle, it can run it down or sell it off. Either way, the obligation will last almost five years. Hence, bankers' fervent belief that "temporary public ownership" will not be anything of the sort.

In late 2008, Northern Rock, advised by Credit Suisse, decided to let Granite go into run-off, meaning that Northern Rock the bank would no longer supply it with fresh mortgages and bondholders would be repaid as old mortgages expire.

=== Debt reduction strategy ===
On 18 March 2008, Northern Rock announced the measures that it would be taking to reduce the government debt within three to four years. The bank is to cut around a third of jobs (2,000) by 2011; on 1 May the bank confirmed that they would be initialising talks with the unions and that most of the job losses would be later in 2008.

As of 30 September 2008 the bank was repaying the loan well ahead of target, owing a net balance of only £11.5 billion of the loan that stood at £26.9 billion at the end of 2007.

On 21 October Standard & Poor's Ratings Services revised their outlook on Northern Rock to stable from positive; they also affirmed the bank's long and short-term 'A/A-1' counterparty credit ratings. The Press Association noted on 22 October that Northern Rock may give their employees bonuses in the future, if certain targets in paying back the Government loan are met.

On 21 January 2009 it was revealed that the bank's employees would receive a 10% bonus, due to the bank meeting its targets for repaying the Government loan. This caused some unrest from a number of media outlets and the Liberal Democrats' Vince Cable for example, but the decision to issue the bonus was defended by the Unite union, calling it a reward for their hard work and dedication.

On 3 March 2009 Northern Rock noted that only £8.9 billion of the loan remained unpaid.

On 1 October 2010 the bank announced that another £700 million had been paid off of the loan in the last three months.

=== Job losses ===
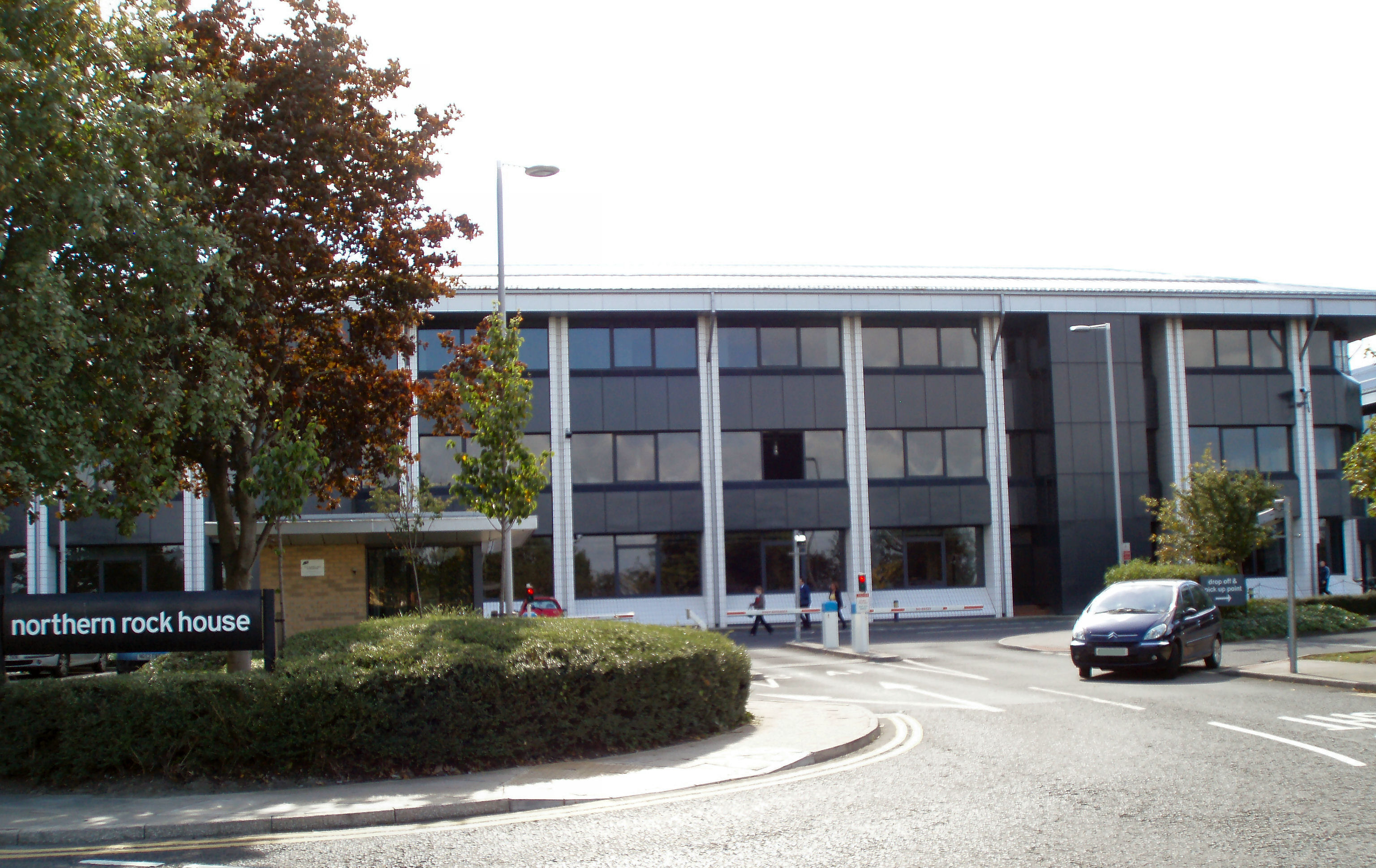
The 1990s buildings at the bank's headquarters at Regent Centre, Gosforth, Newcastle.

At the end of July 2008 Northern Rock announced the first set of redundancies; 800 staff were made compulsorily redundant and a further 500 staff left under a voluntary redundancy programme. It aimed to halve its £100 billion loan book by either selling off mortgage assets to other lenders or by declining to offer new mortgages to existing customers.

On 8 June 2010 as a part of the restructuring process it was announced that a further 650 jobs would be lost in the North East locations of the bank before the end of the year.

In a report commissioned by development agency One North East it was detailed that the downfall of the bank cost the local region around £800 million, mainly in relation to the job losses. The report was kept confidential until 2010.

On 28 March 2011 the bank announced that it was likely that around 680 more jobs would go during the restructuring prior to the bank's return to private sector.

=== Danish operations ===
On 18 March, Northern Rock announced the termination of its Danish savings operation. All accounts in the Danish branch were closed on 18 April 2008.

=== Lloyds TSB deal ===
On 5 June it was announced that Lloyds TSB, a former bidder for the bank, would assume a proportion of the Northern Rock mortgage book over 3 years; this would be achieved by Lloyds TSB offering new mortgages to Northern Rock customers who are nearing the end of their fixed-rate deals.

=== Sponsorship ===
It was confirmed on 20 May 2008 that Northern Rock would continue to sponsor both Newcastle United and the Newcastle Falcons, the former due to the long-term agreement between them and the club. Chief Executive Ron Sandler was quoted as saying:

"We have already ended a number of sponsorships that I inherited... but we have chosen to continue the sponsorship of Newcastle United and Newcastle Falcons, partly because of commitments we have entered into there – sometimes sponsorships continue until they come to a contractual end – and partly because I believe it is in the commercial interest of the bank that we should continue with both of these."

In 2007, almost three weeks before the bank had to appeal to the Bank of England for an emergency loan, the bank bought the home ground of Newcastle Falcons Rugby Club, Kingston Park stadium for £15 million. In February 2008, documents relating to the sale came to light, attracting much criticism that the purchase has been made at a time of impending crisis. In late 2008 the bank sold Kingston Park stadium to Northumbria University for an undisclosed fee.

On 18 January 2010 Northern Rock announced that they had signed a new 4-year sponsorship deal with Newcastle United, worth between £1.5 million and £10 million, starting from the 2010/11 season. The sponsorship agreement with the Newcastle Falcons came to an end before the start of the 2010/11 season.

=== Head office and The Tower ===
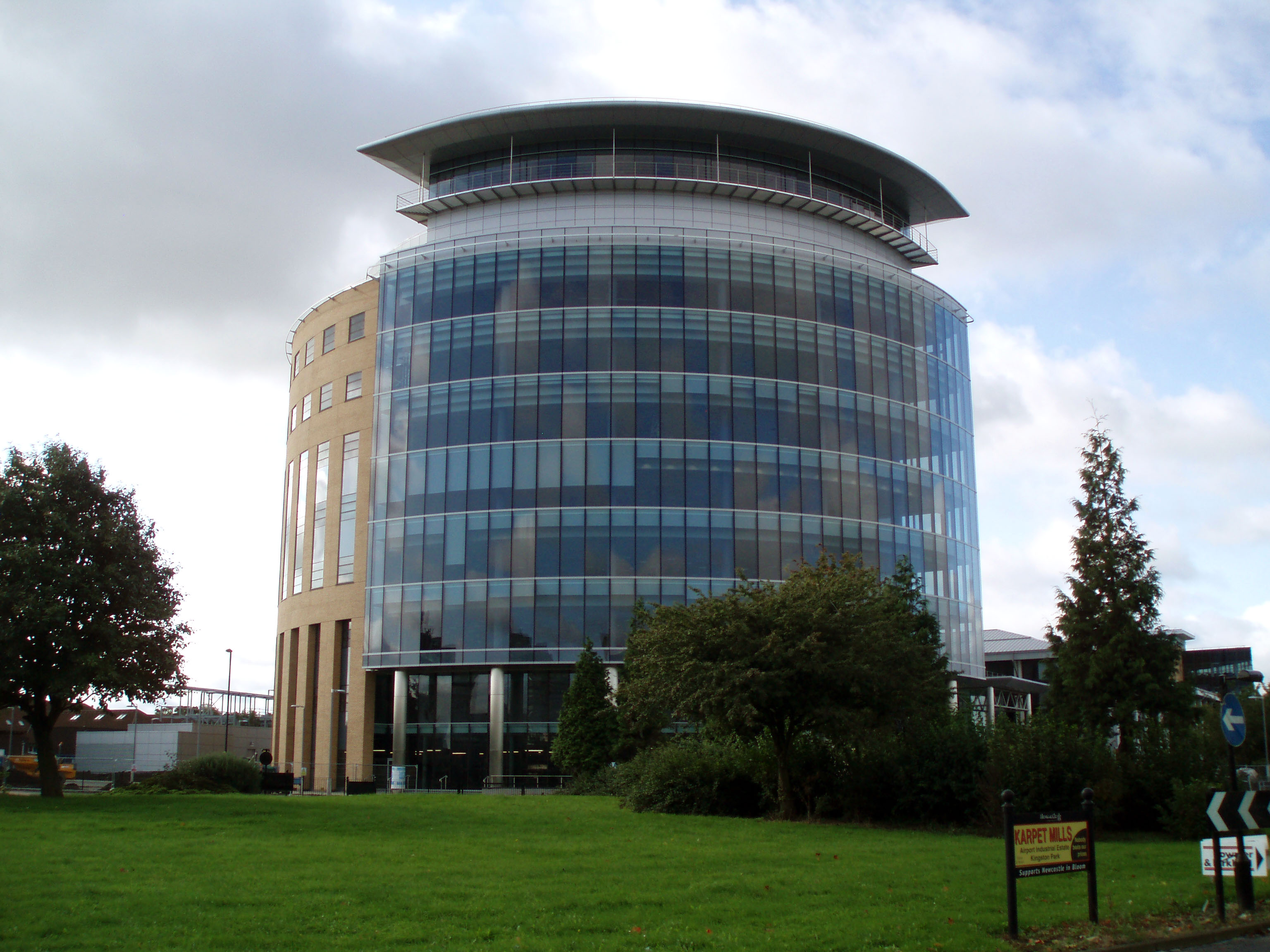
The Tower, during the final stages of its construction in 2008.

At the time of its nationalisation, Northern Rock was developing two new offices. At its headquarters at the Regent Centre complex in Gosforth, Newcastle upon Tyne the bank was midway through construction of a 10-storey tower that would provide a focus for the whole site. As the redundancy programme has made the new space surplus to capacity, the bank sought to sell or lease the tower building to a third party. The bank also developed a site at Rainton Bridge, which was also surplus to capacity, and it sold the site to npower.

In April 2009, the local council, Newcastle City Council, announced that they were to buy the building for £22 million, and lease it to a green support services company, Eaga. By November the sale of the building was complete, and the council renamed it Partnership House.

=== Northern Rock Foundation ===
Prior to Nationalisation, the company donated substantial amounts annually to its own charity, the Northern Rock Foundation. Nationalisation ended the covenant requiring Northern Rock to remit a share of profits to the foundation. Instead, for the next three years the foundation would receive an annual £15 million payment from Northern Rock, whether it remains publicly owned or returns to the private sector. The foundation's shares were cancelled and compensated in the same way as those of other shareholders.

=== Shareholders, hedge funds and legal action ===
Two hedge funds that owned 20% of the bank, SRM Global and RAB Capital, took legal action against the government, regulators and individuals whose nationalisation of the bank, they believed to have been inappropriate, and a contributory factor to the current crisis. On 15 January 2008, a meeting was held at the 11,000 seat Metro Radio Arena to discuss the situation which then existed, where all but one of the proposals put forward by the hedge funds were rejected. In May Legal & General joined the hedge funds, as an "interested party". The hedge funds requested that an independent valuer assesses the level of compensation and to argue that the bank's shares are worth more than the final price of their trading prior to nationalisation. This legal action was thought to have started on 8 May. A number of Northern Rock shareholders have also taken action in an attempt to get some level of compensation for their shares. Three North Labour MPs agreed to hand a series of petitions in, on behalf of shareholders who lost hundreds of thousands of pounds when their shares were confiscated.

As of 6 July around about 10 firms had applied to value the bank. The Times reported on 3 August that Houlihan Lokey, BDO Stoy Hayward and L.E.K. Consulting were the three companies short listed by the government to value the bank. On 9 September The Times reported that Andrew Caldwell, a valuations partner at BDO Stoy Hayward had been chosen as the valuer, with a fee of £4.5 million.

The legal action brought by investors against the Government started in the Royal Courts of Justice on 13 January 2009. Shareholders were also staging a demonstration outside the court. One of the points that was revealed about the case is that they were examining who 'leaked' the information about the bank receiving its emergency government bailout. In order to give full consideration, Lord Justice Stanley Burnton and Mr Justice Silber reserved their decision, before they gave a written judgment of the case. On 13 February it was announced that the shareholders had lost the case. Roger Lawson of the UK Shareholders Association said that there was a 'good chance' that they would appeal the decision.

In May 2009, it was reported that Sir Anthony Clarke and two other senior judges in the Court of Appeal would hear the next stage in the judicial review starting on 10 June for three days. On 28 July it was revealed that the shareholders lost their appeal, but some shareholders said that they would now try to take the case to the House of Lords. On 22 December it was reported that the shareholders had again lost their appeal, and now they would be going to the European Court of Human Rights in Strasbourg.

On 8 December it was announced that the Northern Rock shareholders were to get no compensation, based on the findings of the valuer Andrew Caldwell. This then went to a tribunal, Northern Rock v. Andrew Caldwell and HM Treasury, Upper Tribunal (Tax and Chancery Chamber), NR/001/2010, where the shareholders' appeal was rejected.

In 2011 Harbinger Capital Partners LLC, an entity which had held an interest in some £277 million preference shares in Northern Rock, and Chris Hulme, chairman of the Northern Rock Shareholders Action Group, lost their legal battle to overturn the valuation of the shares being worthless. In January 2013 Harbinger's appeal was being heard in London.

=== Repossession accusations ===
In October 2008 a small number of charities and media outlets accused Northern Rock of having an aggressive repossession policy. These allegations were denied by the bank's spokesman Simon Hall.

=== Restoration of confidence ===
By October customers appeared to be regaining confidence in the bank, when it emerged that there had been a surge in the number of new accounts which had been opened. People appeared to see Northern Rock as a safe place to put their money, given the current status as a nationalised bank which cannot fail. The bank decided to remove some of their savings products from the market, as the bank has a commitment to take only a 1.5% share of total UK retail deposits.

In January 2009 the media began to speculate about the Government having plans to use Northern Rock as a way of boosting lending. On 19 January, it was announced that Northern Rock would change its business strategy by offering more retention deals to its existing mortgage borrowers as their products expire, hence taking longer to pay back the remainder of its Government loan. Alistair Darling noted that it was "not appropriate for Northern Rock to continue to shrink its activities". Reuters reported on 23 January, that the Government were considering injecting up to £10 billion into Northern Rock, as a new business plan at the bank. However, there was concern that the European Commission may object to changes in how the bank is run, that it could break EU state aid rules, and the Commission were investigating the matter.

In late February media sources began reporting that a section of the bank was to become a "good bank", issuing more mortgages, when it is injected with £10–14 billion by the Government. On 23 February 2009 Northern Rock announced that they would be offering £14 billion worth of new mortgages, over the next two years, as a part of their new business plan. This new lending was partly funded by an increase in the government loan, a reversal of previous strategy to pay the loan off as quickly as possible by actively encouraging mortgage customers to leave when their mortgage deal matures. The reason for this change being government policy to increase the availability of credit. This £14 billion was split into £5 billion in 2009 and £9 billion in 2010.

In March 2009 mortgages issued by the bank rose by 70%, compared to the previous month. In February 2010 The Times claimed that Northern Rock was interested in buying some of the branches of RBS and Lloyds.

In February 2010 the government decided to remove the 100% guarantee of the deposits at Northern Rock. Savers received 3 months notice before the removal of the guarantee at the end of May. This means that, like most banks, only the first £50,000 (or as of October 2011, £85,000) deposited was guaranteed.

== Eventual return to the private sector ==
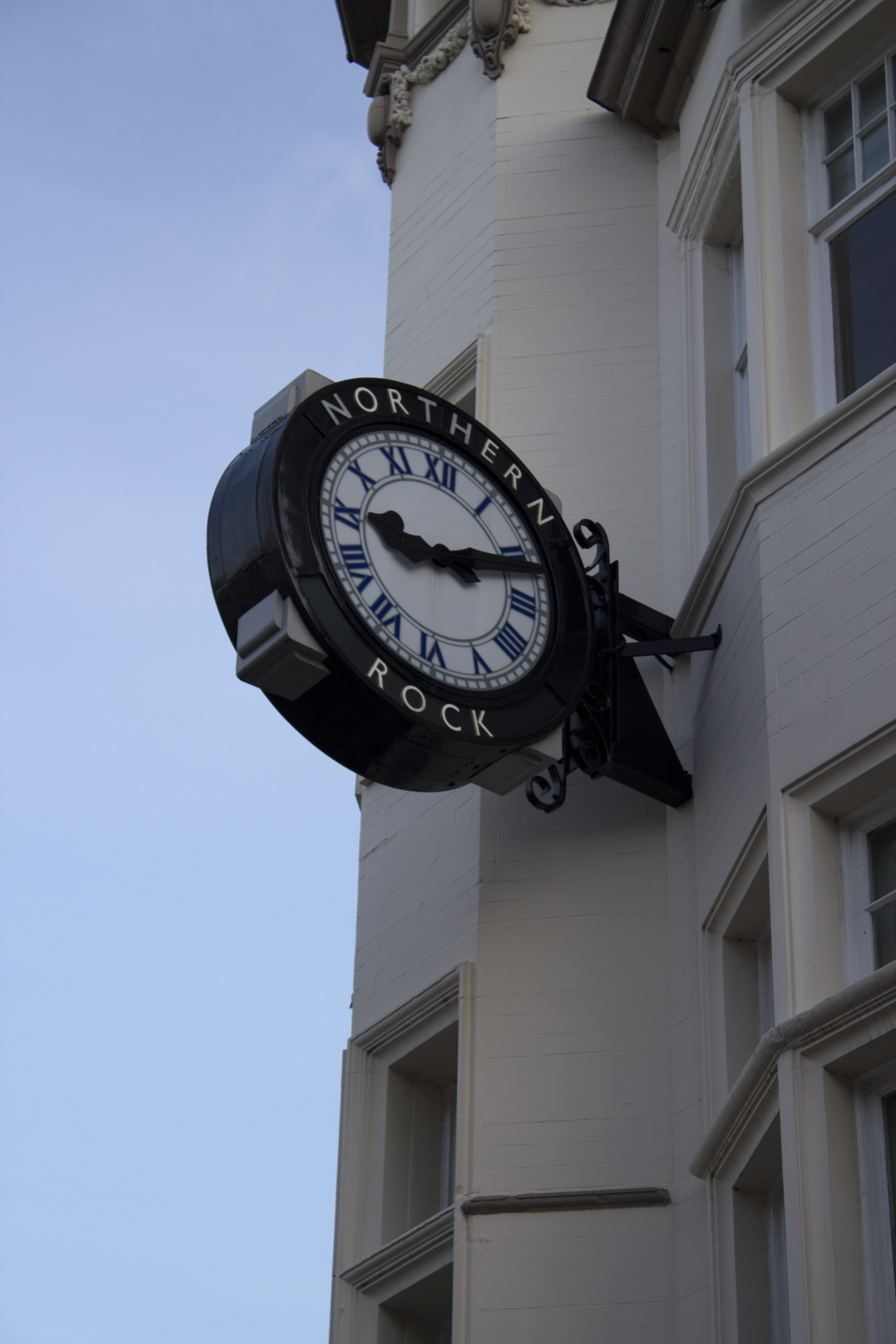
The clock outside this branch, on Northumberland Street, Newcastle upon Tyne, is emblazoned with the bank's name and has become a popular image in print and television coverage of the Northern Rock crisis.

When the British Government nationalised the bank, they noted that it was to be a temporary measure, and one of their aims was to eventually return the bank back to the private sector. On 26 April 2009, The Times suggested that the Government would sell Northern Rock by the end of 2009. Potential buyers included Virgin Money, National Australia Bank, Santander, Blackstone and TowerBrook. The Times noted that a British supermarket chain, Tesco, was interested in buying parts of the bank. It is thought that adviser Credit Suisse examined the plans to split the bank into 2 parts, to separate the most toxic loans and assets into a "bad bank". In May 2009 the EU demanded more information about the split. Another possibility was a bond debt buyback.

A spokesperson for the bank said that the sale of the bank was just one option, and there was currently no time scale. Reuters noted that there were considerations to sell the bank, but no formal discussions were taking place with potential buyers. Alistair Darling has stated that he is in no hurry to return the bank back to the private sector.

In January 2010 National Australia Bank were widely reported to have lined up potential advisers on the deal to buy the Northern Rock. NAB already owned two brands in the UK, Clydesdale and Yorkshire banks. Also in January 2010 Virgin purchased a small bank, the Church House Trust, but according to the Times and other sources Virgin still had an interest in Northern Rock and had been contacting companies such as Blackstone.

In July 2010 it was reported that a consortium of City executives were gathering to place a bid for Northern Rock using the vehicle NBNK Investments. UKFI have been briefed on the proposals. On 4 November Gary Hoffman left Northern Rock to become CEO at NBNK Investments. Hoffman was put on gardening leave by Northern Rock until he joins NBNK on 1 May 2011. Hoffman was to receive a package worth around £500,000 for his gardening leave, but decided to turn it down. Due to Hoffman's previous position NBNK Investments would not be permitted to table a bid for Northern Rock for a period of 12 months from 1 November 2010.

In January 2011 renewed speculation about the bank's sale was reported as it emerged that UKFI were beginning to search for both advisers and suitors for the potential sale. On 11 March Deutsche Bank AG were appointed to be the advisers for Northern Rock's return to the private sector.

On 28 March 2011 the bank announced that it was likely that around 680 more jobs would go during the restructuring prior to the bank's return to private sector.

On 15 June 2011 it was announced that the bank was to be sold to a single buyer in the private sector by the end of the year.

On 17 November 2011 the UK Government announced the sale of Northern Rock to Virgin Money for £747m.

=== Banking and assets split ===
On 26 June 2009 the bank confirmed that it was to be split into two parts, an "assetco" and a "bankco". The plan was also to include that the remaining amount of the government loan was to be repaid by the end of 2010. On 28 October the European Commission approved plans to split the bank off and sell the "good" parts off. On 8 December the Northern Rock plc Transfer Order 2009 was laid before Parliament and in this the Treasury announced that this restructuring would take place from 1 January 2010.

There are two companies; the first being a new company, to be re-registered with the name "Northern Rock plc", which contains the bank's retail and wholesale deposit business, and the second being the current Northern Rock plc renamed to "Northern Rock (Asset Management) plc", which retains the balance of the bank's mortgage book, the Government loan, other borrowings, derivatives and certain wholesale deposits (held on behalf of Granite). The bank, "Northern Rock plc", would be offering new savings and mortgage products, but the other company, "Northern Rock (Asset Management) plc", will not.

The subsidiary in Guernsey, Northern Rock (Guernsey) Limited, and all Irish accounts are owned by the new Northern Rock plc.

After the split there are two boards of directors; Ron Sandler is the chairman of the new Northern Rock plc and Richard Pym is chairman of the Asset Management company. Gary Hoffman is chief executive of both companies.

On 10 March 2010 Northern Rock (Asset Management) plc announced that for the year 2009 the company made a better than expected loss of £257.4 million; this was a vast improvement on the previous year's losses of £1.36 billion.

As a part of the restructuring the Guernsey business was shut down on 2 September 2010. Customers of the Guernsey business were given three months notice.

The €650 million worth of Irish deposits were sold to Permanent TSB in 2011.

On 23 July 2012 it was announced that Virgin would be acquiring £465 million worth of mortgage assets from Northern Rock (Asset Management) plc. In July 2013, private equity firm JC Flowers agreed to buy $450 million of the bank's loans from the British Government.

In December 2012 an administrative error was uncovered in the wording of the loan agreements made by the bank in 2008 for around 152,000 customers; the error may cost an estimated £270 million. As a result of the error the affected customers, who were borrowing £25,000 or less, may be entitled to a repayment of interest.

==== Bradford & Bingley mortgage book merger ====
Around the time of the nationalisation of Bradford & Bingley's mortgage book the press suggested that merging it with Northern Rock was a possibility. In October 2008 the chairman Ron Sandler noted that there had been informal talks concerning the idea of the merger with the government, but there had been no subsequent discussion. Sandler did however add "It would not surprise me at some point if a closer look was taken at the method of managing loan books within government-owned banks".

In March 2009 Alistair Darling said that he was keeping his options open during the "fast-moving" crisis in the banking industry, and thus not ruling out the possibility of a mortgage book merger between Northern Rock and Bradford & Bingley.

On 24 March 2010 UKFI announced its intention to integrate Northern Rock (Asset Management) plc and Bradford & Bingley plc under a single holding company. On 1 October it was announced that Bradford & Bingley plc and Northern Rock (Asset Management) plc had been merged under a single holding company UK Asset Resolution Ltd. In 2014 the Northern Rock name disappeared from asset management company's name as it became NRAM plc.

In 2015 UKFI announced that it will seek expressions of interest for the divestment of mortgage servicing capabilities of the NRAM business as well as the Granite securitisation vehicle. UKFI have appointed Moelis & Company as advisers for the divestments.

=== Remutualisation proposals ===
In September and October 2009 various groups of people, including the Building Societies Association, called for the Northern Rock to be remutualised. Treasury minister Sarah McCarthy-Fry said that the idea of mutualisation had not been ruled out. The Northern Rock Building Society had previously been de-mutualised in 1997, to become a bank.

In the Labour Party's 2010 Manifesto there was a mention of a possible "mutual solution" for Northern Rock. The Liberal Democrat's Manifesto noted that the party would have turned Northern Rock into a building society.

On 1 February it was reported that Yorkshire Building Society were interested in Northern Rock. It has also been reported that Nationwide Building Society are not interested in the bank. On 31 March 2011 the Coventry Building Society expressed an interest in remutualising Northern Rock as a part of Coventry.

== Sale to Virgin Money ==
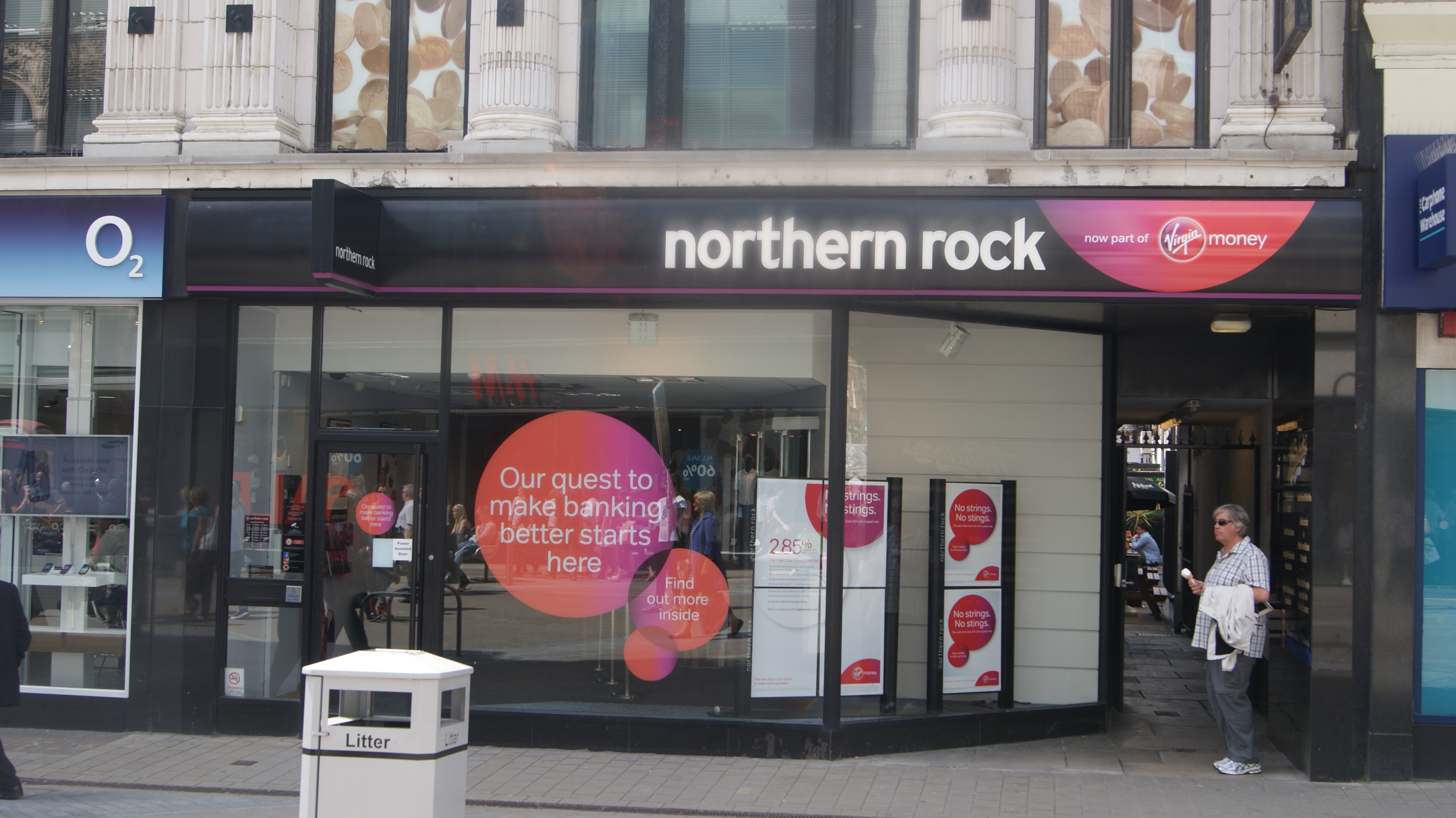
A branch of the Northern rock with partial Virgin Money branding on Briggate in Leeds.

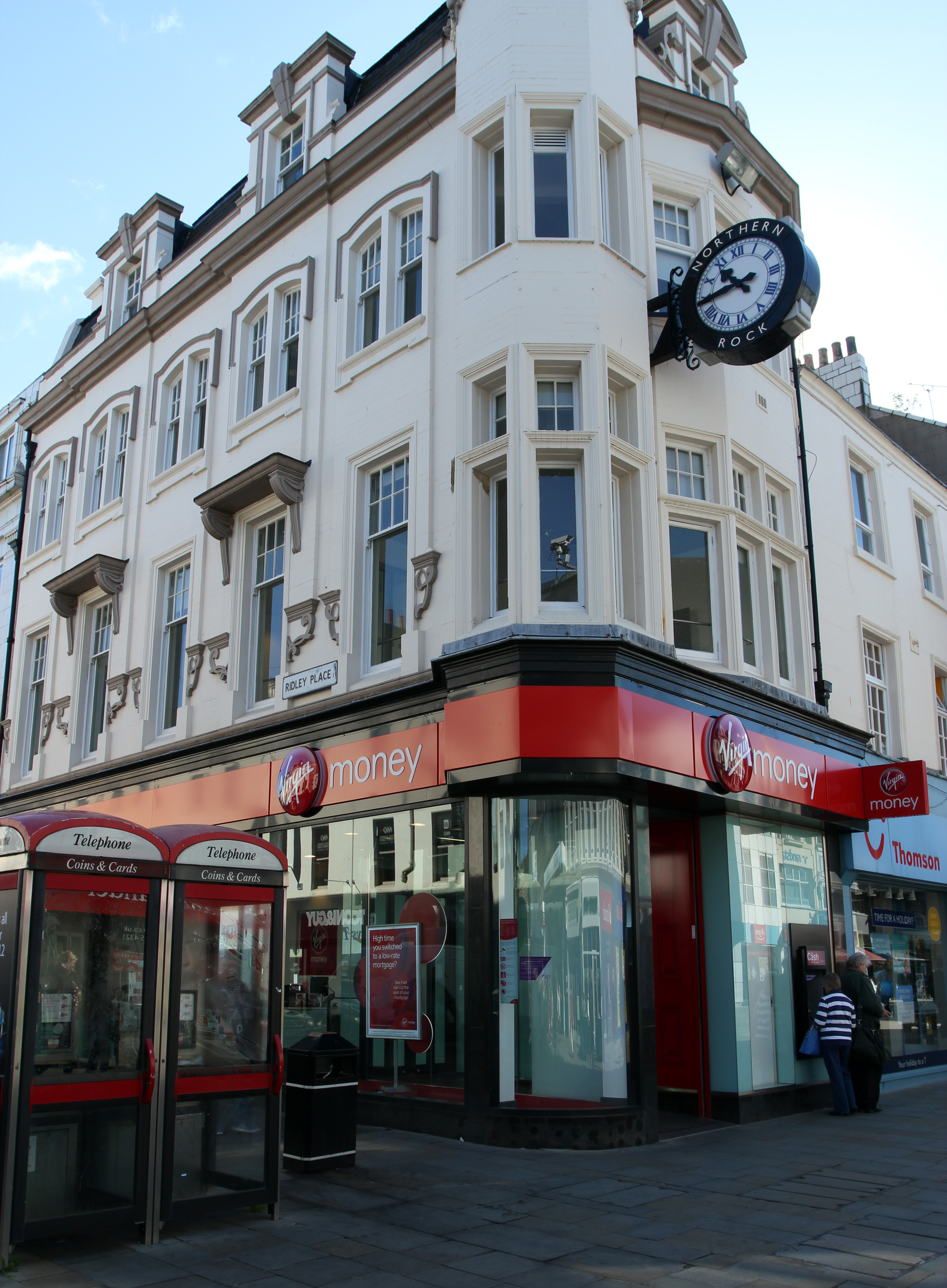
The rebranded Virgin Money Northumberland Street store, Newcastle upon Tyne.

During 2011 the government encouraged another round of bidding for the bank. By the first round deadline on 28 July Virgin Money and JC Flowers put forward their expressions of interest. In late October Virgin Money submitted their 2nd round bid for the bank. The following day NBNK rejoined the bidding process for the bank, leaving only NBNK and Virgin as contenders. This came as the restriction on NBNK from Hoffman's appointment expired; at this time NBNK were also preparing a bid for 632 branches of Lloyds. On 17 November 2011 it was announced that Virgin Money Holdings (UK) Limited were going to buy Northern Rock from UKFI for £747 million up front and other potential payments of up to £280 million over the next few years. These additional payments which would take the value of the sale to over £1 billion could include a £150 million capital instrument and an additional cash consideration of £50–80 million would be paid upon a future profitable IPO or sale in the next five years. A £73 million deferred consideration was paid by Virgin by July 2012. In 2014 Virgin Money repaid a further £154.5 million that it had received as part of the refinancing package.

The sale went through on 1 January 2012. The government said it had no plans to sell Northern Rock (Asset Management). There will be no further job losses for at least three years, except for the ones already announced previously. Virgin have also pledged to keep the headquarters of the new Virgin Money bank (savings and mortgages) in Newcastle upon Tyne. The deal is pending regulatory and EU merger approval, and the combined business will operate under the Virgin Money brand.

The deal with Virgin included jobs for 2,100 employees, around a million of Northern Rock's customers, 75 branches and around a £14bn mortgage book and a £16bn retail deposit book. Although the deal means that the British government are to lose hundreds of millions on the deal, they claim that this represented the best deal for the taxpayer. The purchase was funded by the Virgin Group and WL Ross & Co., and Virgin hope that the new enlarged Virgin Money with its 4 million customers will be "a significant new competitor in UK retail banking". WL Ross has a 44% stake in the enlarged Virgin Money – this is larger than his stake in Virgin Money after their purchase of Church House Trust in 2010.

The deals with the Northern Rock Foundation will be extended to at least 2013, giving Virgin and the foundation time to agree how they will work together. The new Virgin Money also aims lend £45bn in total to support its customers over the next five years. The enlarged Virgin Money is led by Sir David Clementi, as chairman, and Jayne-Anne Gadhia, as chief executive officer.

In December 2011 the National Audit Office announced an investigation into the splitting of assets within the bank and sale of the retail bank to Virgin Money. They revealed their findings in May 2012 where they believe that the split was "reasonable at the time but the final net cost to the taxpayer could be some £2 billion".

By October 2012 what remained of the retail operations of Northern Rock now operated under the Virgin Money brand. On 12 October 2012 Northern Rock plc was renamed Virgin Money plc, and Virgin Money Limited was renamed Northern Rock Limited. The Northern Rock website became a redirect to Virgin Money's website.

In October 2014, it was announced that Virgin Money Holdings (UK) plc would float shares on the London Stock Exchange in order to raise approximately £150 million which would go towards expanding and enabling it to continue to hire and maintain its existing base of top staff members. The successful offer led to a final payment of £50 million to the UK Government with respect to the company's IPO following the purchase of Northern Rock.

Subsequently, in 2018, Virgin Money UK was itself was acquired by the larger CYBG plc, operator of Clydesdale Bank and Yorkshire Bank, for £1.7bn. In 2024, the Nationwide Building Society announced its intent to acquire Virgin Money. In October 2024, the Nationwide Building Society completed the acquisition of Virgin Money for the amount of £2.9 billion.

== See also ==
- Northern Rock (Asset Management)
- Partnership House
- Northern Rock
- UK Financial Investments
- Banking (Special Provisions) Act 2008
