= Gary Hoffman (businessman) =

British businessman (born 1960)

Gary Andrew Hoffman CBE (born October 1960) is the chairman of Monzo and Coventry Building Society. In April 2020 he was appointed as chairman of the English Premier League a role he began on 1 June 2020.

He was formerly the chief executive of Northern Rock and NBNK and chairman and chief executive of Hastings Insurance.

In April 2021, Hoffman faced criticism of his actions within his role as chairman of the Premier League. This involved allegations of complicity in the failed European Super League attempt, and of acting with bias in the Premier League’s blocking of the Newcastle United takeover. Later in July 2021 it emerged that Internet bank Monzo, which Hoffman was chairman of, was under investigation for potential money laundering breaches. Monzo was fined £21 million in July 2025.

Hoffman became chair of Northamptonshire County Cricket Club in October 2024.

He was appointed a Commander of the Order of the British Empire (CBE) in the 2026 New Year Honours for services to the Economy and to Sport.
