= Partnership House =

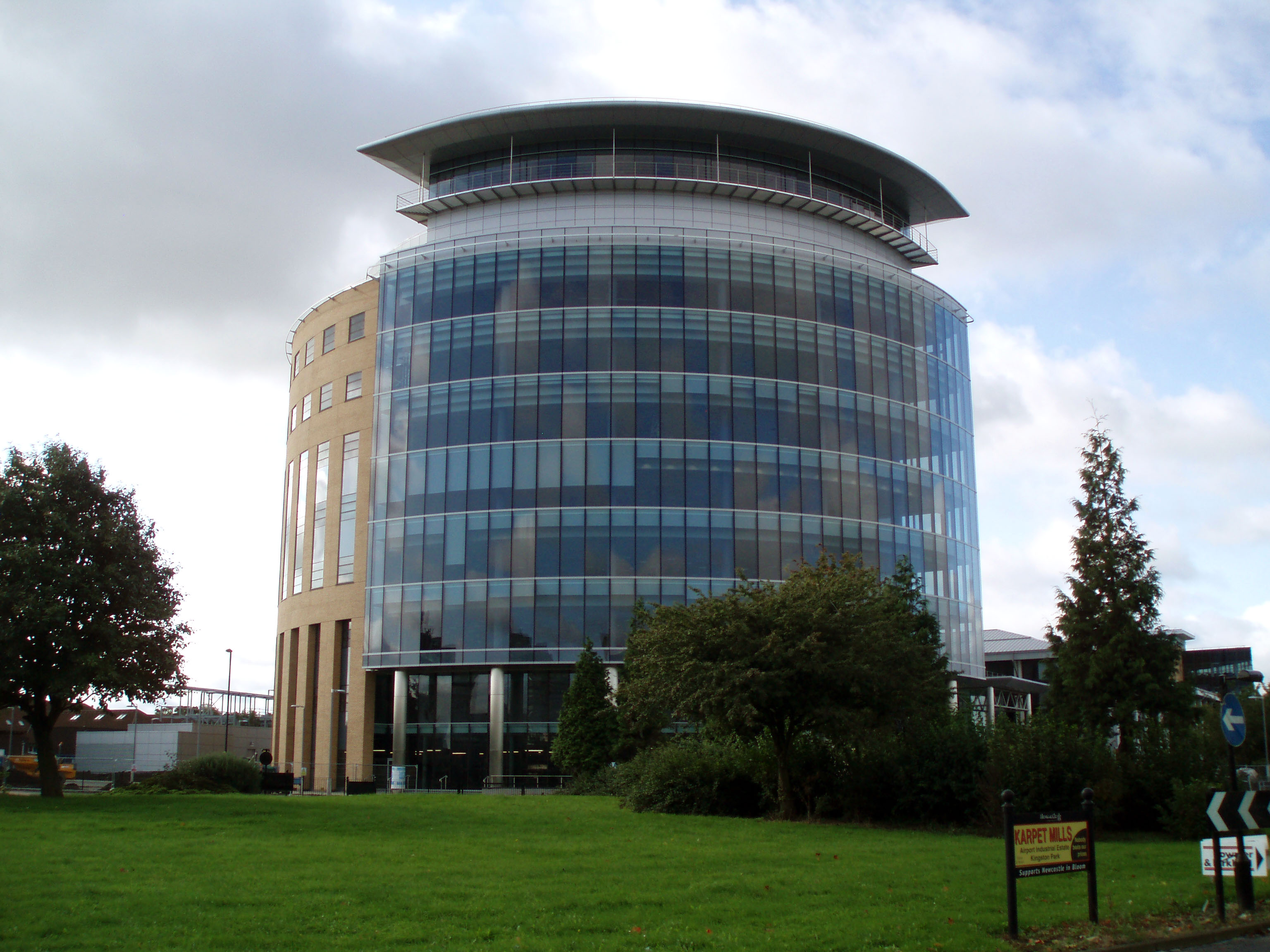
- Partnership House, during the final stages of construction in 2008.
- Interactive map of the Partnership House area
- Former names: Northern Rock Tower, The Tower

General information
- Type: Offices
- Location: Regent Farm Road, Gosforth, Newcastle upon Tyne, United Kingdom
- Coordinates: 55.0105°N 1.6256°W
- Current tenants: Clifford Chance; Astrium Services; Wood Group; Ubisoft Reflections
- Construction started: 2006
- Completed: November 2008
- Inaugurated: October 2009
- Cost: £35 million
- Client: Northern Rock
- Owner: Newcastle City Council

Technical details
- Floor count: 10

Design and construction
- Architecture firm: Red Box Architecture
- Main contractor: Taylor Woodrow

Partnership House (historically The Tower) is a landmark tower office building in Gosforth, Newcastle upon Tyne, United Kingdom. It is located within the Regent Centre business park, and was originally built to act as the main entrance and landmark building within the headquarters complex of the Northern Rock bank, prior to its near-collapse and nationalisation. It lies in the West Gosforth council ward. The building is owned by the local council, Newcastle City Council, whereas the majority of the Regent Centre buildings are owned by Omnia.

The council bought the building, initially known as The Tower, for £22 million, and it is currently leased to a number of companies including Astrium Services, Wood Group and Ubisoft Reflections.

== History ==
=== The 1960s Northern Rock Tower ===
In the 1960s, a 10-storey tower building was constructed for the newly formed Northern Rock Building Society in Gosforth. This became the focal point of the Fordgate Group's Regent Centre complex in Newcastle upon Tyne. The Northern Rock Building Society was formed in 1965 as a result of the merger of Northern Counties Permanent Building Society (established in 1850) and Rock Building Society (established in 1865). Although not technically a part of Regent Centre, the Northern Rock buildings are adjacent to the complex.

During the 1990s, the expanding building society built two new buildings at its Northern Rock House site in Gosforth; the Kielder and Prudhoe buildings. By the late 1990s, along with many other building societies, the Northern Rock Building Society decided to demutualise, and become a bank. After becoming a bank Northern Rock began to grow quickly. This growth in business created the need for more buildings at its headquarters in Gosforth, so two sandstone and glass buildings were erected in the early 2000s.

Northern Rock also had customer contact centre operations at both Doxford International Business Park in Sunderland and at its head office. The bank was also developing a site at Rainton Bridge, which was sold to npower.

=== The 2000s tower ===
In 2004 the bank unveiled its plans for a new building to replace the ageing 1960s tower. The planning application was submitted to Newcastle City Council by Red Box Design Group on 13 September 2004, and the decision to grant the application was made on 17 January 2006. The branch of the bank located in the original tower building was closed on 16 July 2005, to allow for the demolition.

In early 2006 the 1960s tower building was demolished by Thompsons of Prudhoe, and building work began on its replacement building in June 2006. Building the new tower was the final phase of the redevelopment of the Gosforth site. The design for this new tower was similar to the sandstone and glass buildings built in the early 2000s. The Red Box Design Group has been involved with the development of all of the currently standing buildings for the bank.

The new 10-storey building cost £35 million. Taylor Woodrow was the main contractor, and companies such as Desco and Red Box Architecture were involved with the design and construction. The building has been designed to achieve an "Excellent" BREEAM rating. The tower has a semi circular floor plate containing flexible open plan space and external roof top hospitality facilities.

=== After the bank's nationalisation ===
In September 2007 Northern Rock received emergency liquidity support from the Bank of England, due to problems stemming from the subprime mortgage crisis. After the press reported the news, a bank run commenced, where scared customers began to pull their money out of the bank. Private bids for the bank failed, and eventually in February 2008, the bank was nationalised. At the time of its nationalisation, the bank was midway through construction of the 10-storey tower which was intended to create 1500 jobs, and act as the main entrance and focal point of the company headquarters.

The nationalisation led to the company deciding to downsize, including job cubs and deciding to put this new tower building up for let or sale, as the additional space had become surplus to requirements. The company's other site at Rainton Bridge was also to be sold or let to a third party.

The new tower block, simply known as The Tower, was completed in November 2008. The Tower which had a Restaurant area on the ground floor and coffee shop facilities on first floor, had a total lettable area of 120,023sq ft. Gavin Black & Partners and GVA Lamb & Edge were appointed as the joint sole agents for the property. At November 2009 the lease for the building stood at £2.25 million a year.

=== Sale to the council and leasing ===
Newcastle City Council proposed to spend £22 million purchasing the building, and will let it out to another firm, a company set up by the council with support services firm Eaga, on a 25-year lease. A maturity loan over 40 years from the Public Works Loan Board with a predicted interest rate of less than 4.5% will be taken out by the council. The council expect to make money from leasing the building, in excess of the amount that they paid for it. One floor of the building was sub-let back to the council by Eaga (as of 2013 the council has been removed from the building signage).

However, in May 2009, the plans of the Liberal Democrat Council to buy the Tower were thrown into doubt. This was due to Northern Rock deciding to defer their decision to sell the building, as well as opposition from the local Labour Party. On 12 May The Journal newspaper reported that the Northern Rock board had approved the deal, that the Labour opposition had been quelled. This was after a report refuting Labour's claims was put before two scrutiny panels, and that a motion to send the decision back for further discussions was defeated by seven votes to six, at the Civic Centre.

In October 2009 the council completed their purchase of the Tower, and renamed it as Partnership House. As of January 2010 there was around a thousand workers in the offices at Partnership House for the "Real Partnership" - a partnership between the City Council and Eaga. It was officially opened by Peter Mandelson. Eaga was bought by Carillion in April 2011.

The multinational Carillion later found themselves in financial difficulty and Partnership House began to be let to a number of different companies from different industry segments. In January 2013 Astrium Services moved into level 9. In March 2013 Wood Group moved into levels 6 and 7, relocating staff from nearby Northumbria House. In 2013 the NHS logo was added to the building signage. Games studio Ubisoft Reflections has taken 30,000 sq ft over two floors. In May 2016 Cundall moved from the nearby Horsley House into the level 4 of Partnership House.

== Interior dimensions ==
The building has the following approximate net lettable floor areas:

Level	M^{2}
9	598
8	0
7	1,380
6	1,380
5	1,380
4	1,380
3	1,380
2	1,356
1	1,150
0	1,146
Total	11,150

== Image gallery ==
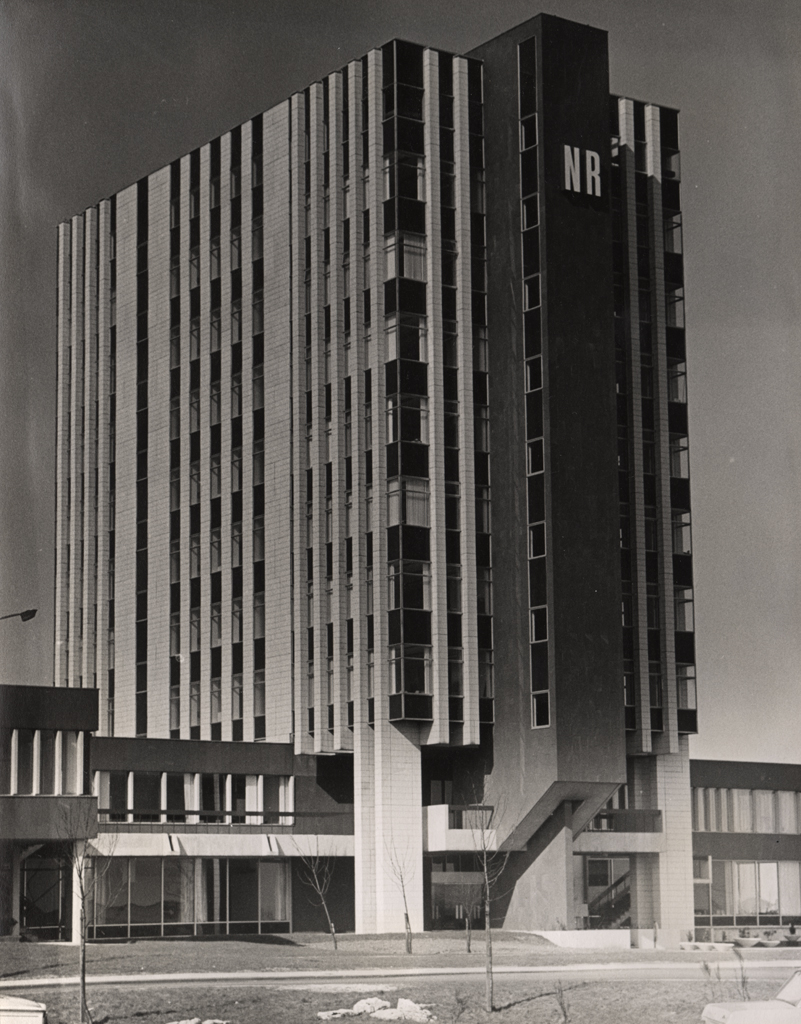
The 1960s building (1969)

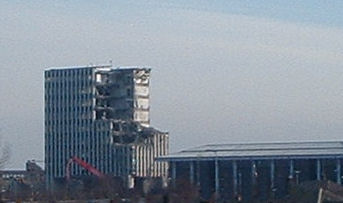
The demolition of the 1960s building (February 2006)

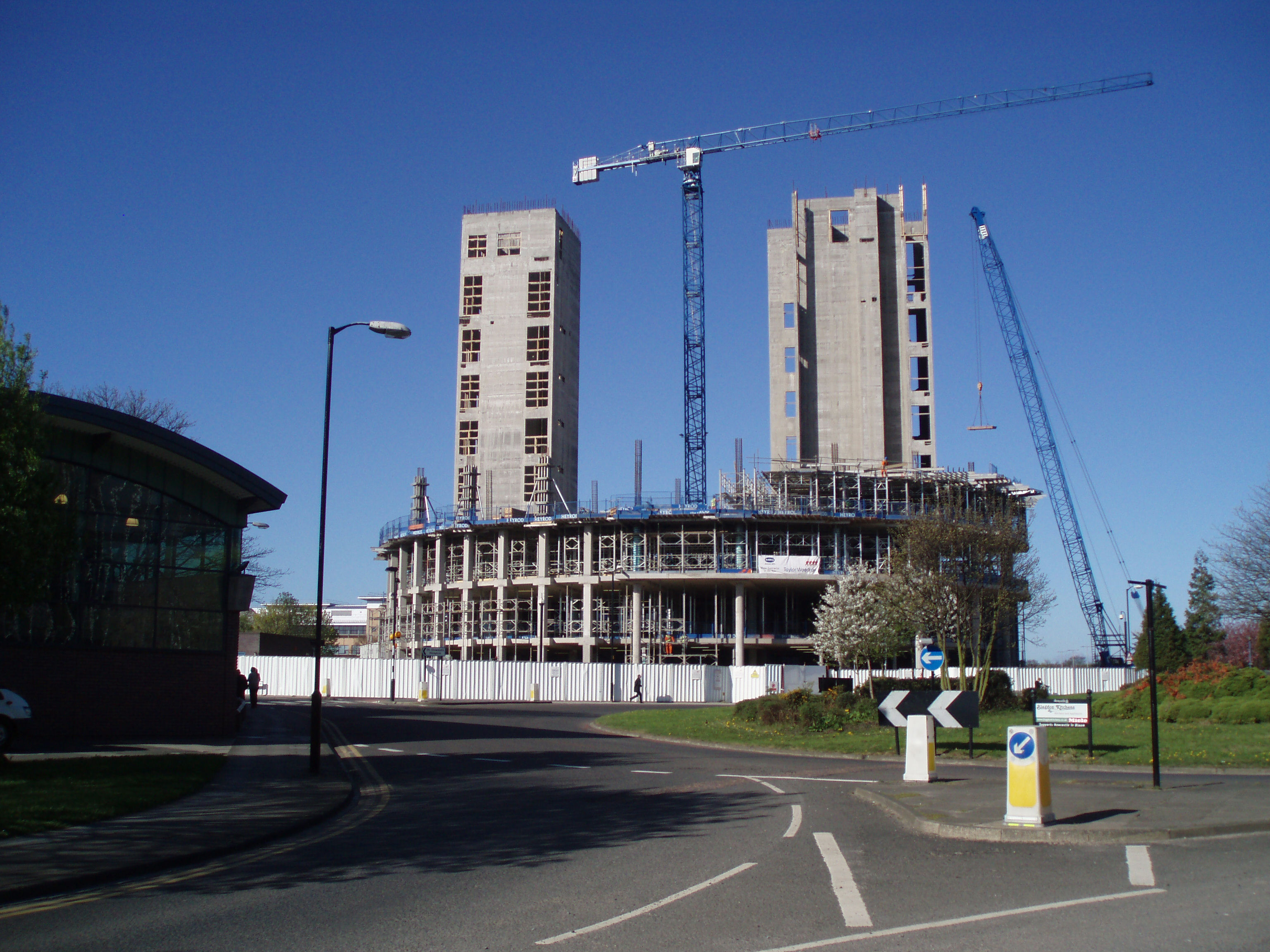
The Tower under construction (April 2007)

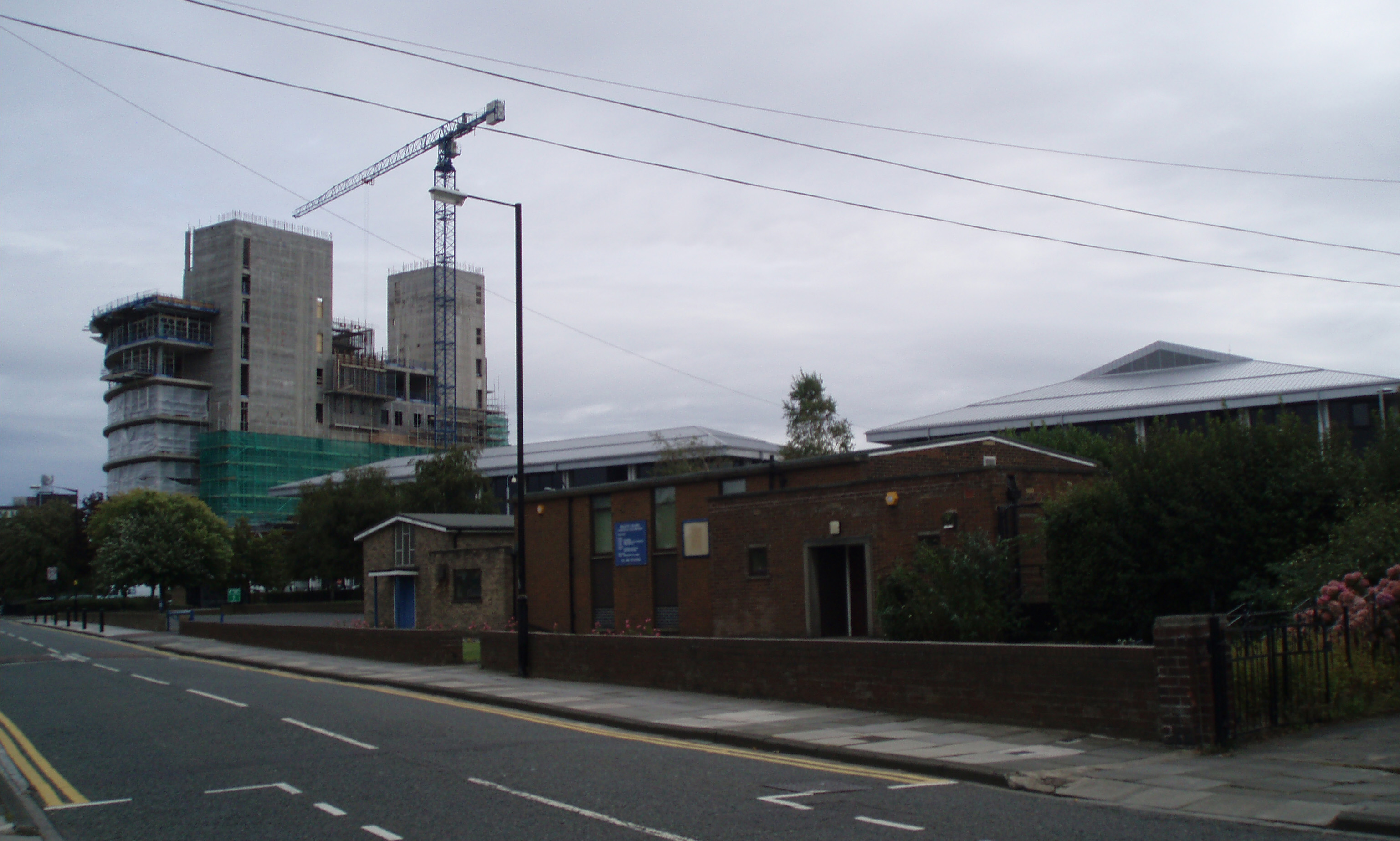
The Tower under construction (September 2007)

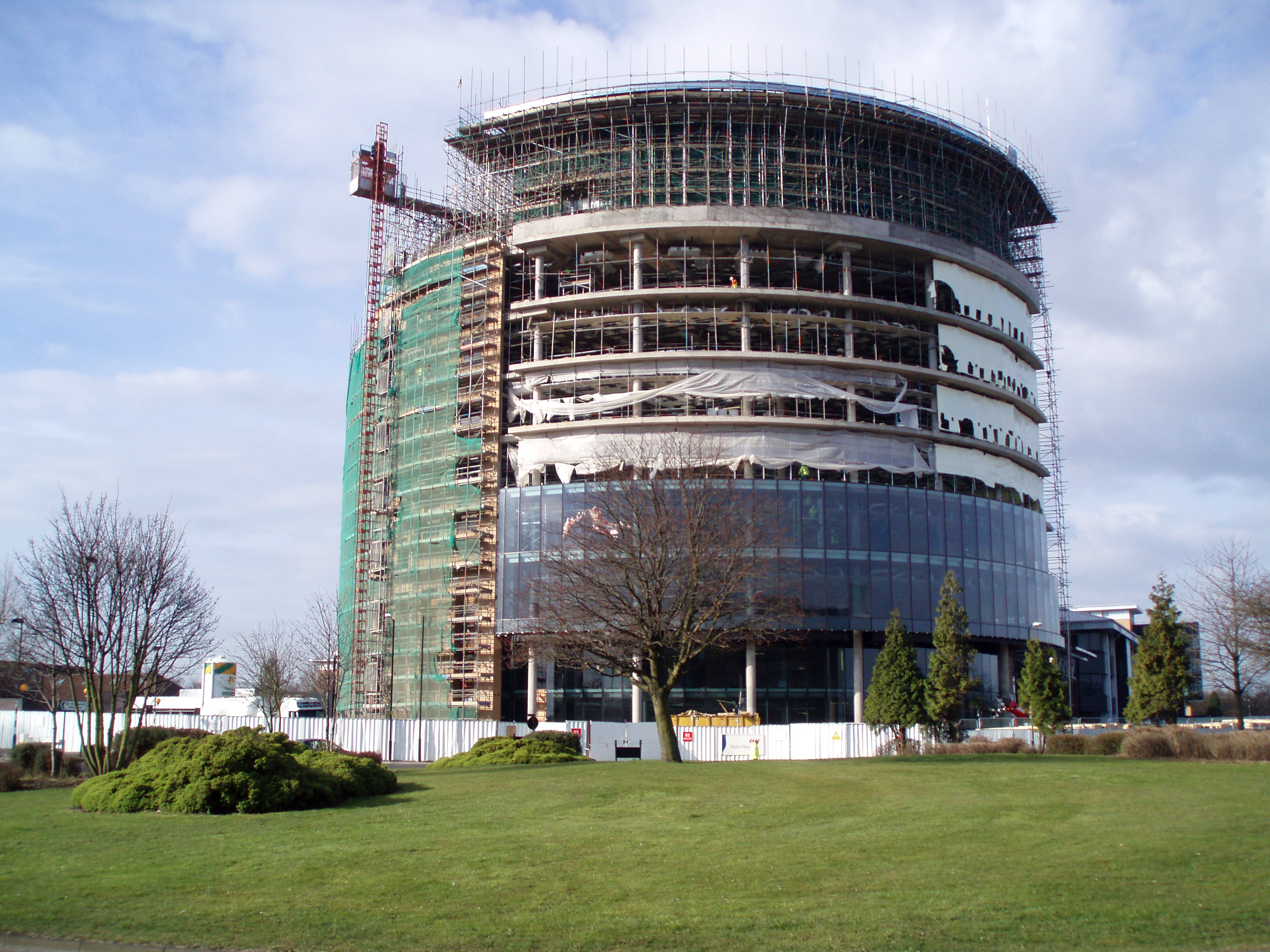
The Tower under construction (March 2008)
