= Northern Rock =

British bank, 1850 to 2012

Coordinates: 55.0103°N 1.6265°W

- Type: Public
- Industry: Bank
- Founded: 1850 (Northern Counties); 1865 (Rock); 1965; 61 years ago (merger, as Northern Rock)
- Defunct: 12 October 2012; 14 years ago
- Fate: Sold to Virgin Money and as of 1 October 2024 part of Nationwide Building Society
- Headquarters: Northern Rock House, Gosforth, Newcastle upon Tyne, England
- Number of locations: 75 branches (2011)
- Area served: United Kingdom (formerly operated in Denmark, Ireland, Guernsey)
- Key people: Matt Ridley (chairperson, 2007); Adam Applegarth (CEO, 2007)
- Services: Banking, Mortgages
- Revenue: £5 billion (2006)
- Operating income: £627 million (2006)
- Net income: £443 million (2006)
- Number of employees: ~6000 (2007)
- Parent: Virgin Money UK

Northern Rock, formerly the Northern Rock Building Society, was a British bank. Based at Regent Centre in Newcastle upon Tyne, United Kingdom, Northern Rock was originally a building society. It demutualised and became Northern Rock bank in 1997, when it floated on the London Stock Exchange with the ticker symbol NRK.

During the early 2000s the company borrowed substantially to fund mortgages, with the aim of ambitious growth, and also donated large amounts to charitable purposes and communities directly and through sponsorships. Due to the 2008 financial crisis, it was unable to produce income as expected from its loans, and was at risk of being unable to repay the amounts it had borrowed. The news that the bank had approached the government for support with its liquidity led within 24 hours to a public lack of confidence and concerns that savings were at risk, and the bank failed following a bank run as people rushed to withdraw their savings. It was the first British bank in 150 years to fail due to a bank run.

Unable to find a commercial buyer or secure the further government support needed, it was taken into public ownership in 2008, as an alternative to insolvency. By that point the government had extended liquidity support of tens of billions of pounds to Northern Rock. An inquiry concluded that the board had failed to properly protect the bank from the risks inherent in its strategy, or to restrain the executive directors where required, therefore although the bank had sufficient assets, it had become vulnerable.

The branch operations were eventually returned to private ownership when the branches and other retail operations were acquired by Virgin Group in 2012, being rebranded as Virgin Money the same year. The mortgage book of higher risk assets was renamed Northern Rock (Asset Management) and later "NRAM plc", and remained in public ownership until it was sold to Cerberus Capital Management in 2016.

As of May 2024 the Northern Rock Shareholder Action Group is continuing its campaign to obtain compensation for the shares that were taken over by the Government when the bank was nationalised during the 2008 financial crisis.

== History ==
Northern Rock Building Society was formed in 1965 by the merger of two North East of England building societies, both of which were based in Newcastle-upon-Tyne: the Northern Counties Permanent Building Society (established in 1850) and the Rock Building Society (established in 1865). During the following 30 years, Northern Rock expanded through the acquisition of 53 smaller building societies, most notably the North of England Building Society in 1994.

Along with many other UK building societies in the 1990s, Northern Rock chose to demutualise as a building society and float on the stock exchange as a bank. Throughout this period an argument against demutualisation was that the assets of a mutual society were built up by its members throughout its history, not just by current members, and that demutualisation was a betrayal of the community that the societies were created to serve. Northern Rock chose to address these concerns by establishing the Northern Rock Foundation, which funded community-based projects. At its Stock Exchange flotation on 1 October 1997 (when it converted from a building society to a bank), Northern Rock distributed shares to members with savings accounts and mortgage loans; the flotation share price was £4.52.

In 2000, it was promoted to the FTSE 100 Index. After the 2007 crisis, it was demoted to the FTSE 250 in December of that year.

On 14 September 2007 the bank sought and received a liquidity support facility from the Bank of England, following problems in the credit markets caused by the 2008 financial crisis. The bank was more exposed than others to restrictions in the supply of credit because of the way it had funded its expansion. It had borrowed short term on the wholesale money markets and lent long term for mortgages on property. This was a policy well known to cause failures (see Banking School Theory of Crises under Financial Crisis) when short-term interest rates rose above long-term rates and insufficient hedging was in place.

The bank was nationalised at 00:01 on 22 February 2008 following two unsuccessful bids to take over the bank, neither being able to fully commit to repayment of taxpayers' money. In doing so, the Government effectively took ownership of the insolvent institution away from its shareholders, without reimbursement. The media reported cases where some shareholders had their life savings in the shares, which were taken from them.

A substantial reduction in the staff was announced in 2008, with 800 people made compulsorily redundant in July of that year, and another 500 taking voluntary redundancy. The bank planned to make another 700 redundant by 2011.

On 1 January 2010 the bank was split into two parts, assets and banking. In June 2011 the bank was officially put up for sale back to the private sector, and on 17 November 2011 it was announced that Virgin Money was going to buy Northern Rock plc for £747 million up front and other potential payments of up to £280 million over the next few years. The sale went through on 1 January 2012. The government said it had no plans to sell Northern Rock (Asset Management) and there would be no further job losses, except for those already announced. Virgin also pledged to keep the headquarters of the bank in Newcastle upon Tyne. The combined business now operates under the Virgin Money brand.

On 12 October 2012 Northern Rock plc was renamed Virgin Money plc, and Virgin Money Limited was renamed Northern Rock Limited.

In 2024, Nationwide Building Society bought Virgin Money, and aims to rebrand the business by 2030.

== 2007 crisis and nationalisation ==
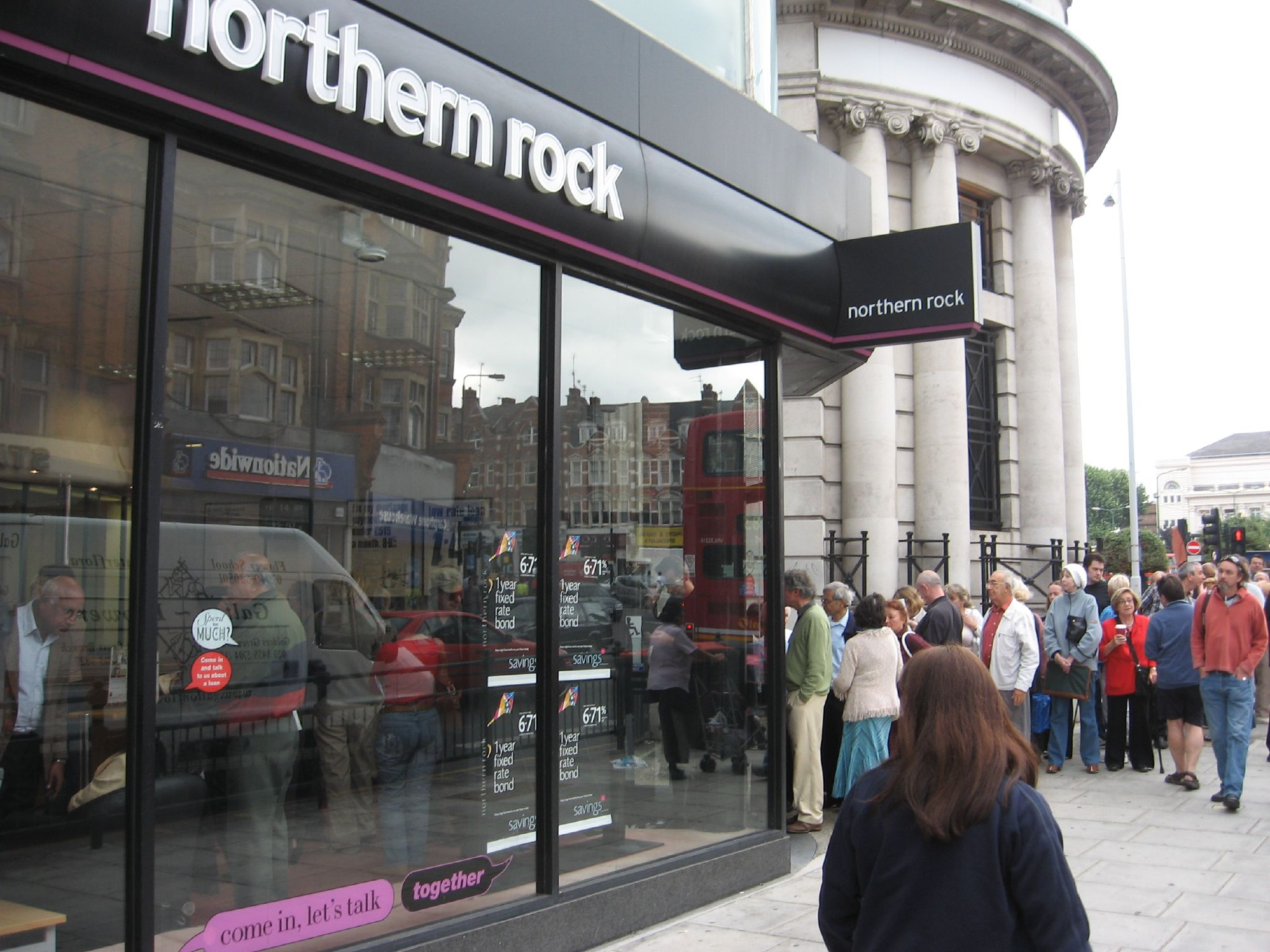
People queuing outside a branch in Golders Green, London, on 14 September 2007, to withdraw their savings due to fallout from the subprime crisis.

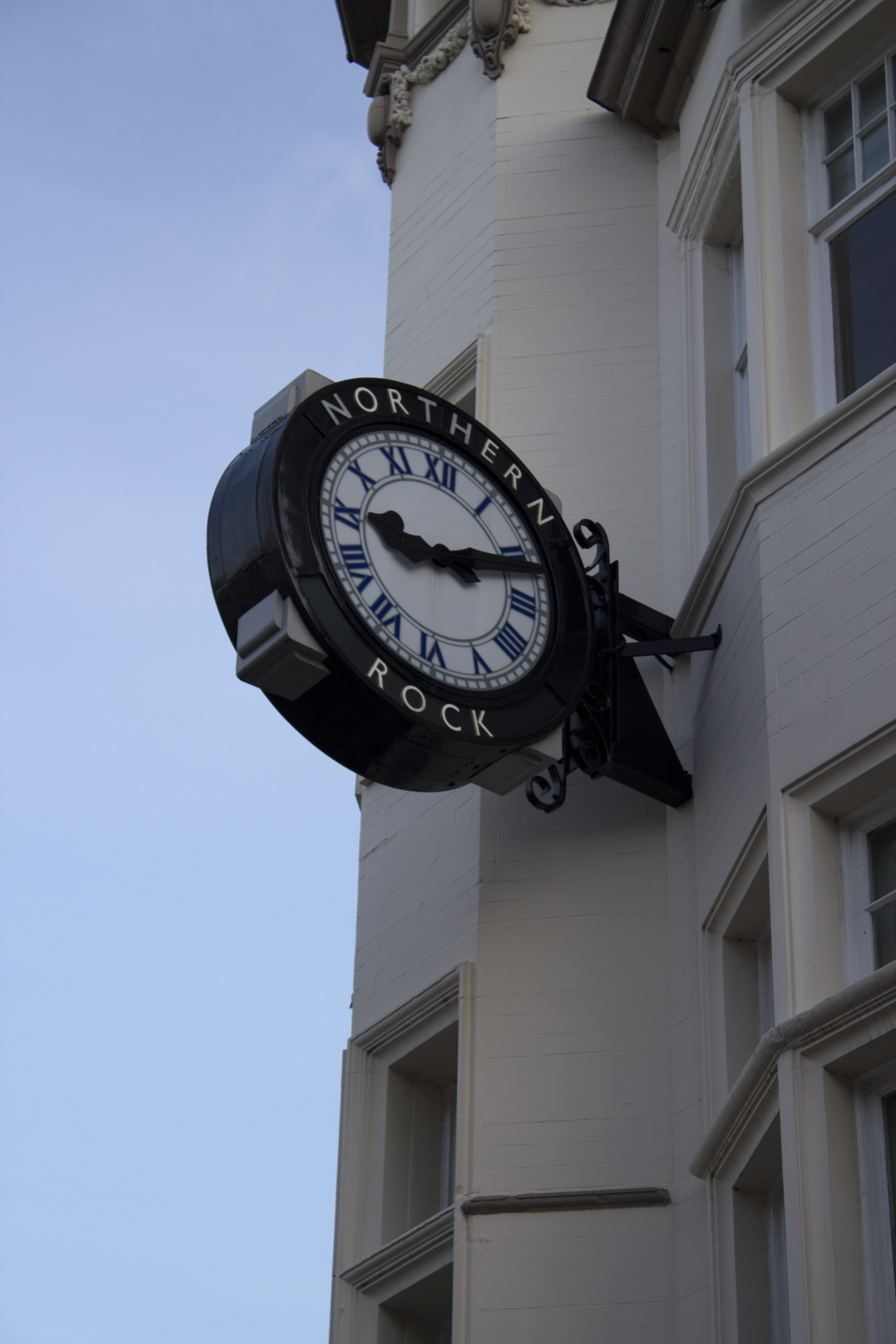
The clock outside this branch, on Northumberland Street, Newcastle upon Tyne, is emblazoned with the bank's name and has become a popular image in print and television coverage of the Northern Rock crisis. Following the Virgin rebranding this clock still features the name Northern Rock.

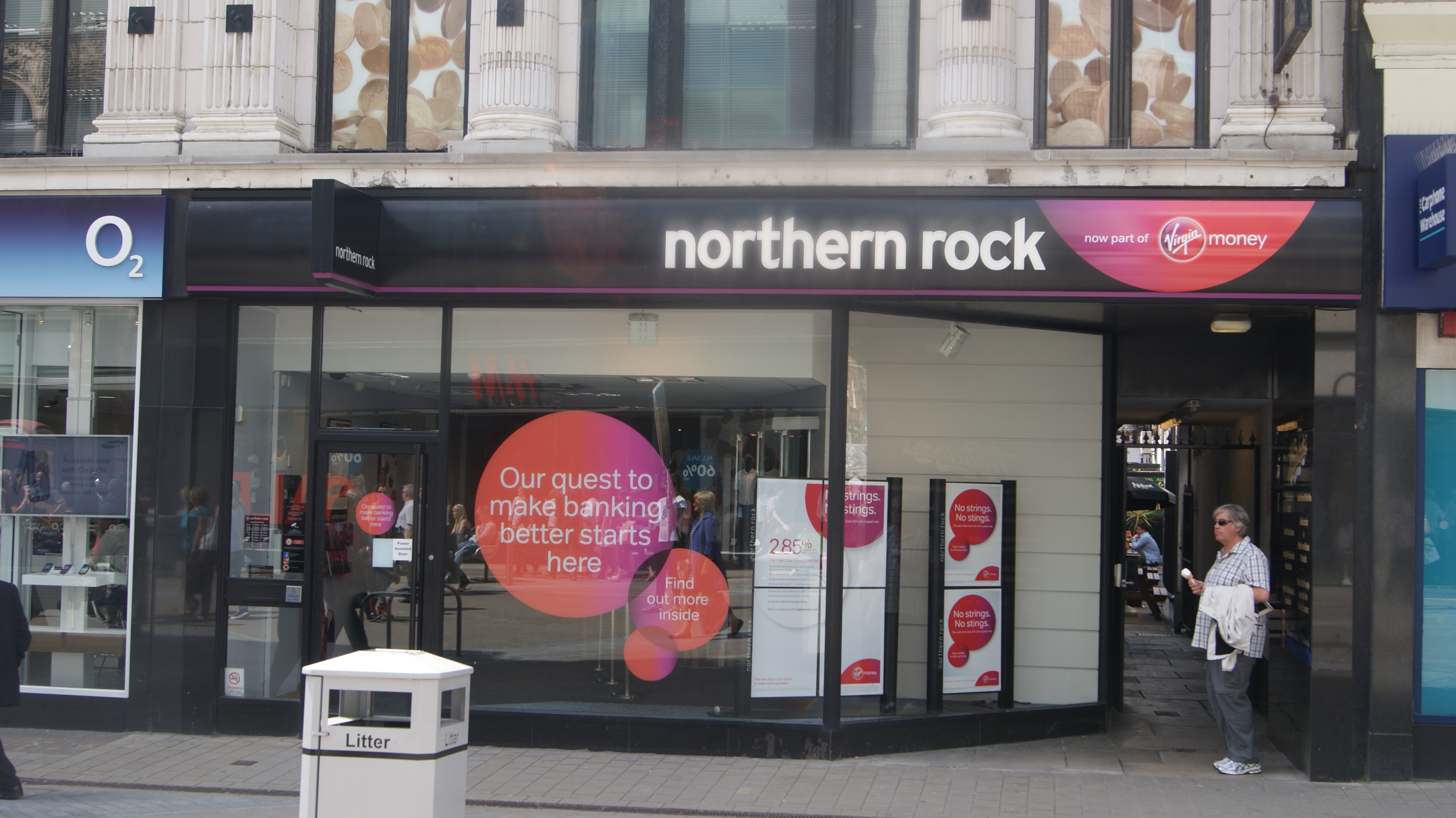
A branch of the Northern Rock with Virgin Money branding on Briggate in Leeds

=== Background ===
Under non-executive chairman Matt Ridley and Chief Executive Adam Applegarth, Northern Rock had a business plan which involved borrowing heavily in the UK and international money markets, extending mortgages to customers based on this funding, and then re-selling these mortgages on international capital markets, in a process known as securitisation. In 2007, there was much press attention given to the growing crisis due to subprime mortgage lending, particularly in the United States. Amid the resultant unease by August 2007, global demand from investors for securitised mortgages had fallen away, and Northern Rock was unable to raise funding by selling its securitised loan books, and therefore became unable to repay short-term loans from the money market.

=== 2007 crisis and initial responses ===
On 14 September 2007, the bank sought and received a liquidity support facility from the Bank of England, to replace funds it was unable to raise from the money market. Reporting of this complex scenario led to panic among individual depositors, who feared that their savings might not be available should Northern Rock go into receivership. The result was a bank run – the UK's first in 150 years – where depositors lined up outside the bank to withdraw all of their savings as quickly as possible, particularly since many other people were doing the same.

As the UK government provided the liquidity support facility, they also exerted pressure on the bank to create a longer-term recovery plan. Over the next few months, there were numerous changes to the board of directors and executive team.

On 19 October, chairman Matt Ridley resigned and was replaced by Bryan Sanderson, a former Managing Director of BP. Chief Executive Adam Applegarth's resignation was then announced in mid-November, with the caveat that he would remain with the group until it established independent funding or was purchased. Four non-executive directors, Sir Derek Wanless, Nichola Pease, Adam Fenwick and Rosemary Radcliffe also resigned. A month later, Applegarth left and former Marketing Director, Andy Kuipers, was appointed Chief Executive.

Notably, Dave Jones, the Group Finance Director through the crisis, had only been in his role since the retirement of Bob Bennett in January 2007. Alongside Applegarth, Bennett had been one of the architects of the bank's flotation in 1997 and its subsequent substantial growth. He had been wary of its continued aggressive growth strategy, which would continue up until summer 2007, despite the increasing volatility in the markets on which Northern Rock relied. Commentators later suggested that with Bennett's retirement, the executive board was dominated by Applegarth. A report by the Financial Services Authority conceded in February 2008 that it had been wrong to consider Northern Rock low risk, and as a result had given the company too little scrutiny.

The group was criticised when it emerged that they had begun to pay in excess of 150 senior staff members substantial retention bonuses. Northern Rock hoped the bonuses would enable them to retain critical staff members at risk of being poached by other companies. It had previously been criticised in 1998 when the pay of the executive team that led the flotation was 40% higher in the year following.

In late 2007, Virgin Money was named as the preferred bidder for the group, with Olivant Group later beginning talks around takeover.

=== Nationalisation ===
On 22 February 2008, the bank was taken into state ownership as a result of two unsuccessful bids to take over the bank, neither being able to fully commit to repayment of taxpayers' money within three years. The bank was managed at "arm's length" by the government through UK Financial Investments.

The bank planned to repay the government debt within three to four years, primarily by encouraging mortgage customers to take their mortgage to another lender. Costs were also reduced by reducing numbers of staff. As of 3 March 2009, the bank was repaying the loan well ahead of target, owing a net balance of only £8.9 billion of the loan which stood at £26.9 billion at the end of 2007.

By October, customers appeared to be regaining confidence in the bank, when it emerged that there had been a surge in the number of new accounts which had been opened. People perceived Northern Rock as a safe place to put their money, given that it was currently government owned. However, there was no guarantee that if Northern Rock was to fail that the government would top-up any compensation over and above the standard £85,000 offered by the Financial Services Compensation Scheme.

Former shareholders and hedge funds also took legal action in January 2009 to get compensation for their shares; the shareholders lost the case. They also lost their appeals in the British courts, but hoped to take the case to the European courts. However, on 8 December 2009, it was announced that the valuer Andrew Caldwell had decided that the Northern Rock shareholders should get no compensation.

On 23 February 2009, Northern Rock announced that they would be offering £14 billion worth of new mortgages, over the next two years, as a part of their new business plan. This new lending was partly funded by an increase in the government loan and a reversal of previous strategy to pay the loan off as quickly as possible by actively encouraging mortgage customers to leave when their mortgage deal matured. The reason for this change was government policy to increase the availability of credit. This £14 billion was to be split into £5 billion in 2009 and £9 billion in 2010.

Potential buyers for the bank included Virgin Money, National Australia Bank, NBNK, Santander, Blackstone, Tesco, TowerBrook, Yorkshire Building Society and Coventry Building Society. Former Chancellor of the Exchequer Alistair Darling had stated that he was in no "hurry" to return the bank to the private sector.

The bank was split into two parts, assets and banking on 1 January 2010. On 15 June 2011, it was announced that the bank was to be sold to a single buyer in the private sector by the end of the year. On 22 March 2011, the bank issued its first mortgage securitisation since the 2007 recession which nearly brought the bank down.

=== Purchase by Virgin Money ===
On 17 November 2011, it was announced that Virgin Money was going to buy Northern Rock plc for £747 million. The sale was completed on 1 January 2012, and by July of that year a further £73 million deferred consideration was paid by Virgin. In 2014 Virgin Money repaid a further £154.5 million that it had received as part of the refinancing package.

=== Northern Rock Shareholder Action Group ===
The Northern Rock Shareholder Action Group (NRSAG) has been active since the Northern Rock crisis began in 2007, seeking fair compensation for the thousands of small shareholders who owned Northern Rock shares. The group is run by a committee of volunteers. The UK Shareholders Association provide administrative and advisory oversight to the group. The Committee reached the conclusion that HM Treasury has made a substantial amount of money from running down the loan book of the bank.

The NRSAG claimed that despite comparable conditions, no other failed bank was handled in this manner during the 2008 financial crisis. Instead, other banks received full Government backing, bailouts and shareholders retained their shares. The Government has earned a sizable surplus in the years after nationalisation, even though any and all Government assistance was completely reimbursed in those years, including interest paid at penal rates at no expense to the UK public. The NRSAG asked the Government to review their original compensation decision, given that the updated and widely confirmed numbers prove a huge surplus. To request an appeal, the NRSAG wrote to the Treasury Select Committee.

== Operations ==
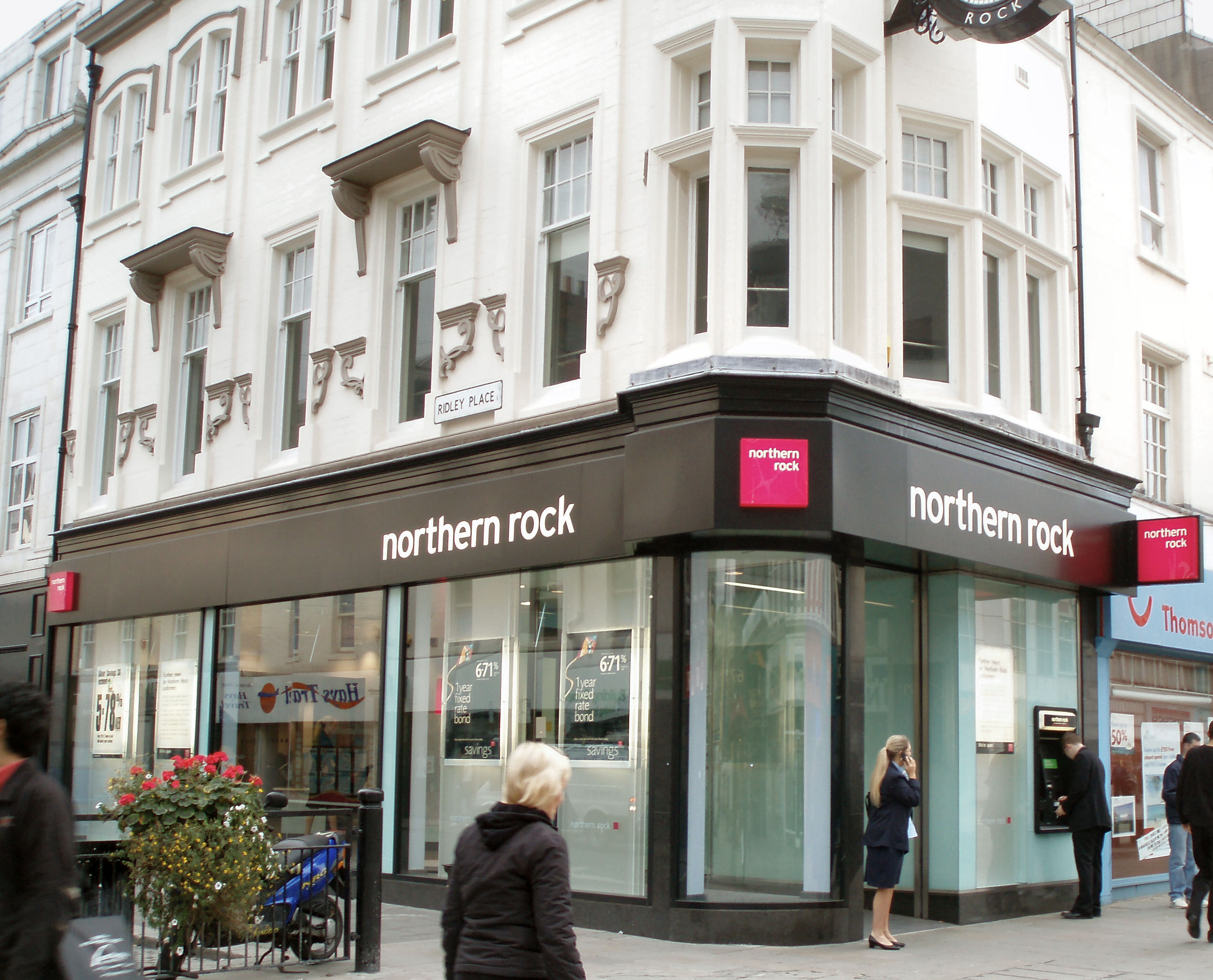
A typical Northern Rock branch, on Northumberland Street, Newcastle upon Tyne in 2007. On 9 January 2012 it was given a temporary Virgin Money rebrand when Richard Branson visited Newcastle, and along with all other branches was fully rebranded later that year.

Northern Rock has been one of the top five mortgage lenders in the United Kingdom in terms of gross lending according to Council of Mortgage Lenders statistics.

The bank offered credit cards until 2003, when it sold the business to The Co-operative Bank in order to free capital for its rapid growth in mortgage lending, making a profit of more than £7 million. Northern Rock continued to sell credit cards under its own brand through The Co-operative Bank until November 2007; the decision to stop was made before the 2007 crisis.

In 2006 the bank had moved into sub-prime lending via a deal with Lehman Brothers. Although the mortgages were sold under Northern Rock's brand through intermediaries, the risk was being underwritten by Lehman Brothers. Mortgages with LTV ("Loan to Value") ratios of up to 130% were made.

== Location ==
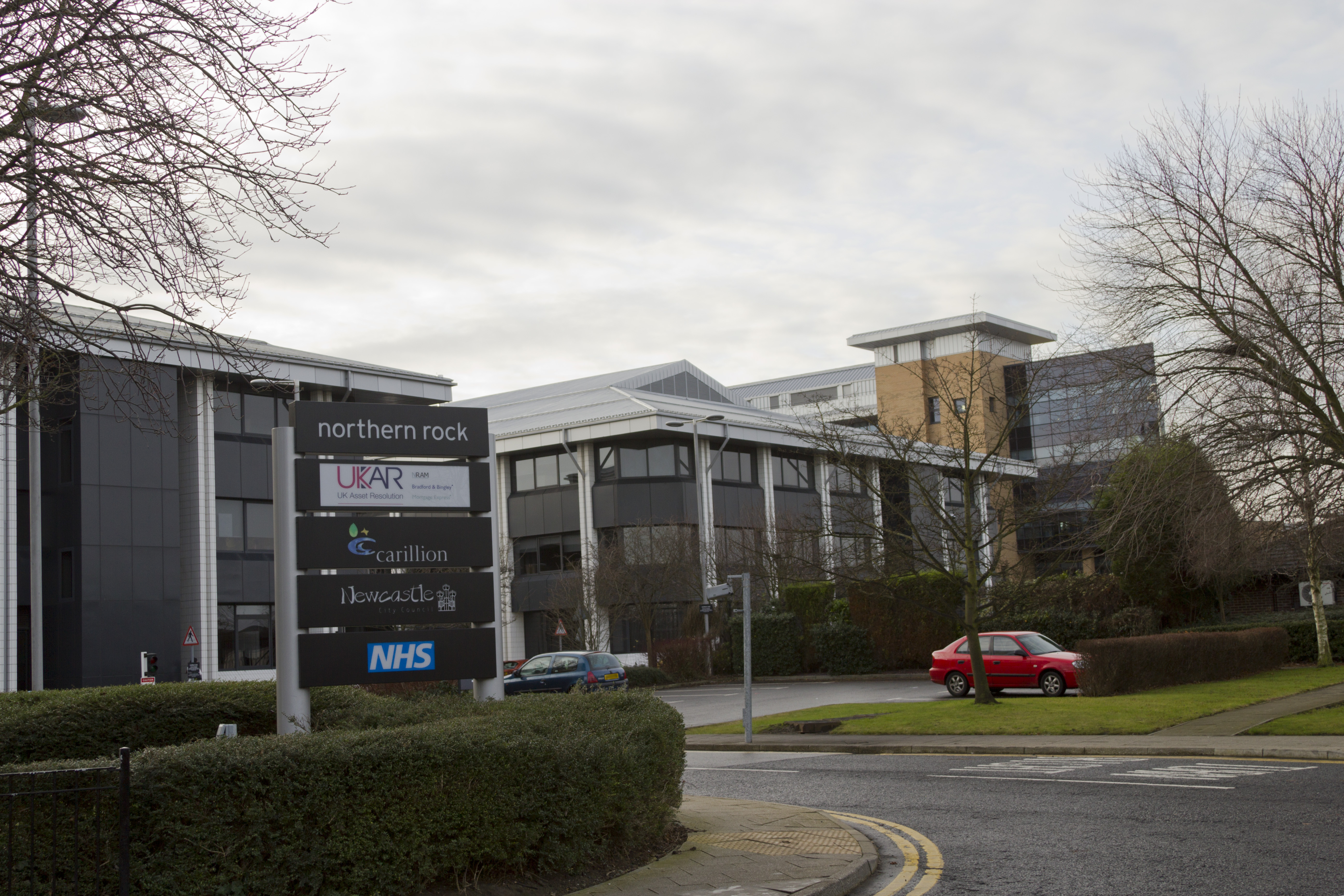
The Northern Rock House buildings at Regent Centre in 2011. The black-coloured buildings were completed in the 1990s, and the sandstone-coloured buildings that can be seen in the background were completed in the 2000s. The Northern Rock sign has since been changed to a Virgin Money logo.

The bank was based on a large site at the Regent Centre in Gosforth, Newcastle upon Tyne called Northern Rock House. It had customer contact centre operations at both North of England House in Doxford International Business Park in Sunderland and at its head office. The bank developed a site at Rainton Bridge, which it sold to Npower.

=== Gosforth site ===
Northern Rock commissioned its original tower block on the Gosforth site, Northern Rock House, in the 1960s. The original building was demolished during Spring 2006. A new tower block, simply known as The Tower, was completed in November 2008, originally intended to create 1500 jobs, and act as the main entrance and focal point of the company headquarters. The local council, Newcastle City Council, purchased the building for £22 million, and leased it to a green support services company, Eaga (now Carillion Energy), as it was surplus to the bank's requirements at the time.

=== Outside the UK ===
A sub-division in Guernsey was established in February 1996, handling offshore savings and investment accounts. The Guernsey business was shut down on 2 September 2010.

Northern Rock opened a branch in Ireland on 16 November 1999 and the first branch in Northern Ireland followed on 4 April 2007. The first branch of the bank opened in Denmark on 7 February 2007; however as part of the Government restructuring, the Danish operations ceased on 18 June 2008. The €650 million worth of Irish deposits were sold to Permanent TSB in 2011.

== Corporate image ==
Northern Rock logo used until 2000

In 2000 Northern Rock introduced a new corporate identity consisting of a magenta square containing the company name. This replaced the NR 'blocks' logo. The Northern Rock Foundation also changed its logo in 2003 from the NR 'blocks' inline with the main company, using the same new typeface. The Red Box Design Group designed all the currently standing buildings at the company's headquarters in Gosforth and have contributed to many of the other design aspects of the company, such as the in-branch styling.

== Board of directors ==
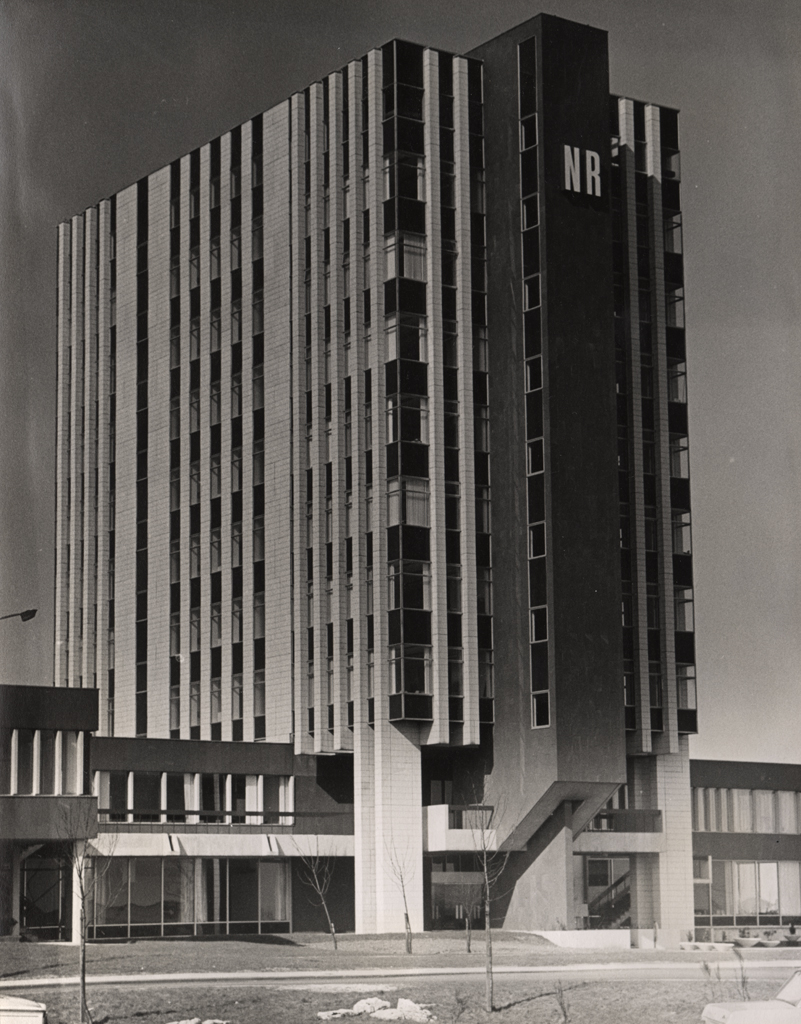
Northern Rock's headquarters building in Gosforth, as seen in 1969, that was in the process of being replaced during the bank's final years.

Matt Ridley was the chairman and Adam Applegarth was the chief executive until Ridley resigned in October 2007 and Applegarth resigned in November 2007, although the latter stayed on in a caretaker role until December 2007. The chief financial officer was Andy Kuipers, who joined the company in 1987. After Applegarth's departure, Kuipers became the interim chief executive prior to the nationalisation before retiring on 31 August 2008.

In February 2008, Ron Sandler was appointed executive chairman by the government. Gary Hoffman became chief executive of Northern Rock in October 2008.

Since the split of the bank into Northern Rock plc and Northern Rock (Asset Management) plc on 1 January 2010, each company had its boards of directors. On 4 November 2010 Northern Rock announced that Gary Hoffman had left the bank and was to move to NBNK Investments as CEO. One of the stipulations of Hoffman's appointment at NBNK was that they could not table a bid for Northern Rock for a period of 12 months.

Prior to being bought by Virgin the board of Northern Rock plc at 8 April 2010 was:

- Chairman: Ron Sandler
- Chief Executive: Gary Hoffman
- Chief Financial Officer: Jim McConville
- Executive Directors: Rick Hunkin
- Non-Executive Directors: Laurie Adams, Richard Coates, Mike Fairey, Mark Pain, Mary Phibbs

== Sponsorship ==
The company sponsored many local sports clubs and events, including Newcastle United Football Club, Newcastle Falcons (rugby union), Newcastle Eagles (basketball), Durham and Middlesex County Cricket clubs, professional golfer Paul Eales and the cycling festival Northern Rock Cyclone.

The sponsorship of Newcastle United began in 2003, and was set to expire in 2010, before an extension to 2014. However this extension included a get-out clause in June 2012, which was activated in November 2011. While under government control the bank continued their sponsorship agreement. The five-year deal from 2005 to 2010 was worth £25 million, and the 4-year extension was to be worth between £1.5 million and £10 million. In 2012 after Virgin bought the bank, Virgin Money signed a 2-year deal to sponsor Newcastle United initially using the remaining time of Northern Rock's deal that was cut short; this deal was again itself later cut short.

In 2005, to coincide with the Spirit of the Tall Ships Festival, Northern Rock enlisted the help of Red Box Interiors to create a temporary art installation at The Baltic Centre for Contemporary Art on the Gateshead Quay of the Tyne. The art entitled "Northern Rock @ Baltic" included mobile light stem sculptures and large scale external graphics.

Northern Rock sponsored the North East Premier League competition for recreational club cricket. In 2006 Northern Rock sponsored the All*Star Cup celebrity Golf match, which was shown on ITV. The bank also sponsors a junior golf tournament, The Northern Rock Junior Golf Festival, held at Matfen Hall.

In 2007, almost three weeks before the bank had to appeal to the Bank of England for an emergency loan, the bank bought the home ground of Newcastle Falcons Rugby Club, Kingston Park stadium for £15 million. In February 2008, documents relating to the sale came to light, attracting much criticism that the purchase has been made at a time of impending crisis. In late 2008 the bank sold Kingston Park Stadium to Northumbria University for an undisclosed fee. While under government control the bank continued to sponsor Newcastle Falcons; the sponsorship agreement with the Falcons came to an end before the start of the 2010/11 season.

== Northern Rock Foundation ==
The company donated substantial amounts annually to its own independent charity, the Northern Rock Foundation. The charity wound up after handing out some of its last grants to good causes across the North East and Cumbria in 2015.

== See also ==
- Landmark Mortgages
- Northern Rock Foundation
- Nationalisation of Northern Rock
- Partnership House and Regent Centre
- UKFI and UKAR
- Banking (Special Provisions) Act 2008
- Virgin Money UK
