= Northern Rock Foundation =

Independent charity in the United Kingdom

- Founded: 4 August 1997; 29 years ago
- Dissolved: 25 April 2016; 10 years ago
- Type: Charitable organisation
- Registration no.: A company limited by guarantee registered in England and Wales number 3416658, Registered charity number: 1063906
- Location: The Old Chapel, Woodbine Road, Gosforth, Newcastle upon Tyne NE3 1DD
- Region served: North East and Cumbria
- Website: www.nr-foundation.org.uk

Northern Rock Foundation was an independent charity and company limited by guarantee in the United Kingdom. It was formed in 1997 when the Northern Rock company was floated on the stock exchange. Following the near-collapse of the bank and its nationalisation by the UK government, followed by the eventual sale of part of it to Virgin Money. The Foundation continued for a number of years. Virgin Money contributed grants totalling £1.5 million in 2011 and 2012, but in April 2014 it was announced that it would be wound down after not being able to agree further funding terms with Virgin. It closed in 2016.

The Northern Rock Foundation aimed to tackle disadvantage and improve quality of life in the North East and Cumbria. Between 1998 and 2016 the Foundation awarded £235.8 million in 4,417 grants.

== History ==
=== Founding ===
The foundation was formed when the Northern Rock company was floated, with an initial donation of 15% of the share capital and a covenant to donate 5% of the company's annual profit thereafter. In 2006, Northern Rock was the second largest charitable giver in the FTSE 100 after ITV.

In April 1996, when the Building Society was considering demutualisation, plans were announced by the then chairman, Robert Dickinson, for the creation of the foundation. Since the official launch of the foundation in January 1998, it has steadily grown and expanded its activities. The Foundation's work is carried out by a professional staff team of 12 based in Gosforth. Previously in 2007 there had been 25 staff at the foundation. In 2003, along with a new logo and the introduction of new programmes, the Foundation moved to a new building – the renovated Old Chapel in Gosforth. At the end of 2006 the foundation received £28.2 million investment. By the end of 2007 £190 million had been donated to the foundation, by Northern Rock.

=== Effect of the Northern Rock nationalisation ===
Nationalisation ended the covenant requiring Northern Rock to remit a share of profits to the Foundation. Instead, for the next three years the Foundation was to receive an annual £15 million payment from Northern Rock, whether it remained publicly owned or returned to the private sector. The Foundation's shares were to be cancelled and compensated in the same way as those of other shareholders. £7.3 million was awarded during the first 10 months of 2008, with an expected further £3.7 million before the end of the year.

=== Effect of the Northern Rock sale to Virgin Money ===
Upon the sale to Virgin Money, the deals with the Northern Rock Foundation was extended to at least 2013, which give Virgin and the Foundation time to discuss how they would work together; Virgin also run Virgin Money Giving, another not-for-profit company. In July 2013 Virgin Money donated £500,000 to the foundation to continue its work during that year.

It was announced on 22 April 2014, that after numerous discussions, Virgin Money could not commit to funding the Northern Rock Foundation, and that as the foundation received no income from any other source it would be wound down. Also in 2014 Virgin Money announced that they would create their own charitable foundation, the Virgin Money Foundation.

In January 2015 the head office of the foundation, The Old Chapel, Gosforth, was sold to another group of charities, the Community Foundation serving Tyne and Wear and Northumberland.

The trustees took the decision to close down the foundation on 25 April 2016.

== Northern Rock Foundation Hall ==
One of the halls at the Sage Gateshead is named the Northern Rock Foundation Hall.
