= Banking (Special Provisions) Act 2008 =

Public General Act of British Parliament

- Act of Parliament
- Parliament of the United Kingdom
- Long title: An Act to make provision to enable the Treasury in certain circumstances to make an order relating to the transfer of securities issued by, or of property, rights or liabilities belonging to, an authorised deposit-taker; to make further provision in relation to building societies; and for connected purposes.
- Citation: 2008 c. 2
- Introduced by: Alistair Darling (Chancellor of the Exchequer)
- Territorial extent: England and Wales, Scotland and Northern Ireland

Dates
- Royal assent: 21 February 2008
- Commencement: 21 February 2008

Status: Current legislation

History of passage through Parliament

Text of statute as originally enacted

Revised text of statute as amended

The Banking (Special Provisions) Act 2008 (c. 2) is an act of the Parliament of the United Kingdom that entered into force on the 21 February 2008 in order to enable the UK government to nationalise high-street banks under emergency circumstances by secondary legislation. The act was introduced in order to nationalise the failing bank Northern Rock after the bank was supported by Bank of England credit and a private-sector solution was deemed "not to provide sufficient value for the taxpayer" by the UK government.

Opposition to the act by the Conservatives was based on: the bill providing an exemption to the Freedom of Information Act 2000, the large liabilities to the taxpayer and the alleged lack of independence from the government. The bill was also sufficiently widely drawn to allow the nationalisation of any financial institution, leading to the concern that other banks might be in financial difficulty.

Following the nationalisation of Northern Rock, the act allowed for the nationalisation of the mortgage and personal loan book of Bradford & Bingley on 29 September 2008.

On 8 October 2008, the Treasury announced that an order under the act was being used to transfer all retail deposits with Heritable Bank, a UK-based banking subsidiary of the failing Icelandic bank Landsbanki, and Kaupthing Edge to ING Direct. However section 2(8) of the act provides that the Treasury may only make transfer orders under the act for a maximum of a year after its passage. The act therefore expired on 21 February 2009, when it was superseded by the Banking Act 2009.

== List of banks acquired/transferred under the act ==
Bank	Action taken	Date	Refs
Northern Rock	Nationalised	21 February 2008	
Bradford & Bingley	Mortgage assets nationalised; savings deposits and branch network transferred to Abbey, a UK subsidiary of Grupo Santander	29 September 2008	
Heritable Bank (subsidiary of Landsbanki of Iceland)	Transferred to ING Direct	7 October 2008	
Kaupthing Edge (division of Kaupthing Singer & Friedlander)	Transferred to ING Direct	8 October 2008	

== See also ==
- 2008 United Kingdom bank rescue package
