= Sandler Review =

In 2001 the Government of the United Kingdom asked the British businessman Ron Sandler to:

- Identify the competitive forces driving the retail financial services industry; and
- Suggest policy responses to ensure that customers are well served.

== Proposals ==
The Sandler report suggested that there are three main reasons why the industry seemed to be failing to serve large portions of the population. The government is particularly worried about so called savings gap, i.e. the failure to provide adequate funds for their retirement. The report cited:

- The complexity and opacity of many financial services;
- The failure of the industry to attract and engage with the majority of lower- and middle – income consumers;
- The inability of consumers to drive the market.

Ron Sandler suggested the development of a suite of simple, low-cost, risk-controlled products. The name “Stakeholder” was given to those products, although they are still referred to as Sandler products. The maximum level of charge permitted per annum for the investment products was set at 1.5% for the first 10 years of the life of the product and 1% thereafter. For stakeholder pensions arranged prior to 6 April 2005, charges are capped at 1% throughout.

The suite of stakeholder products includes five types of products:

- A cash deposit product, similar to a cash ISA. The interest rate will be within 1% of the Bank Of England base rate, and the minimum deposit is no more than £10;
- A medium-term investment product, related to collective investment schemes such as unit trusts and OEICs;
- A smoothed investment fund ( a with-profits-type fund);
- The stakeholder pension;
- The Child Trust Fund.

Controlling the risk is also important. This is achieved by limiting the proportion of shares in the stakeholder unit-linked and with-profit products to 60% of the funds. The remainder must be invested in fixed-interest securities and cash. A simplified selling model applies to these products, with the exception of the smoothed investment. The rules are included in the Conduct of Business sourcebook, and can be summarised as follows:

- The adviser must explain the nature of stakeholder products and must make clear that only basic advice will be given;
- The sale process will be based on a series of short scripted questions in plain language;
- The assessment of suitability for a product will be based only on information disclosed by the questions and will not involve a detailed assessment of the customer's needs but:
  - The customer's savings and investment objectives should be ascertained;
  - The customer's willingness to accept risk should be ascertained, as this may determine which product might be suitable.

The process must be terminated at any stage if:

- The customer requests it;
- The adviser believes there is no likelihood of any stakeholder products being suitable; or
- It appears that the customer is unlikely to be able to afford a stakeholder product.

An assessment should be made of the customer's other financial needs and priorities, and if necessary the customer should be clearly informed of the desirability of meeting the other priorities first:

- If the customer appears to be “significantly” in debt, a stronger warning should be given;
- Additional rules apply to stakeholder pensions, which should not be recommended if the adviser believes there are better options for the customer.
