= NBNK Investments =

British financial investment company

- Company type: Public limited company
- Traded as: LSE: NBNK
- Industry: Banking investments
- Founded: 2 July 2010
- Founder: Lord Levene & others
- Defunct: 21 June 2016
- Headquarters: London, UK
- Key people: Stephen Johnson (Chairman)
- Website: www.nbnkinvestmentsplc.co.uk

NBNK Investments plc was a UK-based financial investment company formed by Lord Levene and a consortium of senior business figures in 2010. The aim of the company was to build a new large UK retail bank primarily through the acquisition of other banks.

As of 2014 the company had failed to acquire any banking assets and had considered winding up as it had been unable to acquire any it had been interested in. However, after new investment from W.L. Ross in 2012 it continued to operate and in May 2014 said that it was still looking for potential acquisitions. By 2016 NBNK had still failed to acquire any target companies, and in June 2016 it entered voluntary liquidation.

== History ==
=== Foundation ===
The company was formed by Lord Levene and a consortium of City executives as a vehicle to acquire UK banking assets in domestic banking and eventually wealth management. On 2 July 2010 the company was incorporated under the name of De Facto 9999 plc, and a month later on 2 August the company name was changed to NBNK Investments plc. The company name, NBNK, is a portmanteau of "New Bank" (NewBaNK), and the company website primarily used the colour purple.

The company was listed on the Alternative Investment Market of the London Stock Exchange on 20 August and has major advisers and investors on-board including Aviva, Invesco and F&C Asset Management. People involved in the consortium include Peter Levene, chairman of Lloyd's of London, Sir David Walker who has been chairman of Morgan Stanley, Charles McCreevy former European Union internal markets commissioner and politician John McFall.

=== Attempts to purchase assets ===
In July 2010 it was reported that the nationalised British bank Northern Rock was a prime target for NBNK Investments. UK Financial Investments Limited, owners of Northern Rock, had been briefed on the proposals. On 4 November Gary Hoffman left Northern Rock to become CEO at NBNK Investments on 1 May 2011. Due to Hoffman's previous position NBNK Investments could not table a bid for Northern Rock for a period of 12 months. In November 2011 it was announced that Virgin Money would be buying Northern Rock.

In September 2011 NBNK announced that trading in its shares would be suspended until takeover talks with an unnamed bank had been concluded. In November 2011 it was revealed that NBNK and the Co-operative Banking Group were the final two bidders for 600 or more of the branches of Lloyds Banking Group. In December 2011, Lloyds said its preferred option for the sale of 632 bank branches was to sell them to the Co-operative Group. That deal between Lloyds and the Co-operative fell through itself and the branches went on to form TSB Bank.

=== 2012 – 2016 ===
NBNK announced on 27 June 2012 that the company would be wound down, as a result of the continuing talks between Lloyds Banking Group and the Co-operative Banking Group and the failure of the company to acquire a bank. At the time of the company winding down it had made three attempts to acquire banking assets, and they concluded that there were no other UK assets for sale that would have met the company's objectives. The company expects to return approximately 40% of the shareholders initial capital. On 28 June the company was restored to trading on AIM.

In July and August 2012 Lord McFall of Alcluith resigned from his post as a Non-Executive Director and Sir David Walker resigned as deputy chairman and Senior Independent Director respectively; Walker became Chairman of Barclays.

However, in late 2012 the company's direction changed again after W.L. Ross & Co Group made an offer to inject new capital into NBNK, take a stake in the company and maintain NBNK as an AIM listed company. W.L. Ross own a stake in Virgin Money, the company that bought Northern Rock which had been a target of NBNK. On 8 January 2013 shareholders agreed to Wilbur Ross' company. At that time 3 members of the board stood down and Wilbur Ross was appointed Chairman of NBNK. Lord Dan Brennan remains as a director. Due to his commitments with the Bank of Cyprus Wilbur Ross resigned as Chairman of NBNK in late 2014 and was replaced as chairman by Stephen Johnson. The policy was to maintain the Company at minimal cost while appropriate opportunities to make an acquisition in the financial services sector were sought. In the event, no such opportunities arose. In June 2016 following an AGM, a decision was made to return funds to the shareholders and the company entered voluntary liquidation.
