= Ron Sandler =

Ron Sandler CBE is a British businessman best known for his contribution in the rescue of Lloyd's of London, where he was CEO from 1995 to 1999. He was also the government-appointed executive chairman of Northern Rock during its three-year nationalization.

== Early life ==
Ron Sandler was born in 1952 in Durban, South Africa, and grew up in Bulawayo, Rhodesia (now Zimbabwe), where he was educated at Milton School. In 1970, he was awarded the Anglo American Open Scholarship to Queens' College, Cambridge where his undergraduate degree was in engineering. During his time at Cambridge, he received a blue in Modern Pentathlon. His post-graduate study was at Stanford University, where he received an MBA in 1976.

== Early career ==
In 1976, Sandler joined The Boston Consulting Group, initially in London, before transferring to California, where, as a partner of the firm, he ran BCG's Los Angeles office. In 1984, he returned to London, to lead Booz Allen's UK operations. In 1990, he became chairman and CEO of moneybrokers Martin Bierbaum Group until the company was sold in 1993. He was then appointed CEO of moneybrokers Exco, where he led the public listing on the London Stock Exchange in 1994. Sandler left Exco at the end of 1994 following a boardroom disagreement.

== Lloyd's of London ==
Sandler joined Lloyd's of London in early 1995 to lead the restructuring of the Lloyd's insurance market. He was appointed CEO later that year. In 1995, Lloyd's was in crisis, following an accumulation of major losses that had prompted extensive litigation against Lloyd's agents by many of the Names who provided the market's capital. Under the leadership of Lloyd's Chairman, Sir David Rowland, Sandler was instrumental in devising and executing the Reconstruction & Renewal ("R&R") initiative that brokered a settlement with the litigating Names and ultimately led to the rescue of Lloyd's, and the return to its leading role in the global insurance market. Included within R&R was the creation of Equitas, the reinsurance vehicle designed to ring-fence the Lloyd's market from earlier liabilities. R&R also paved the way for the introduction of corporate capital into Lloyd's. Following the successful conclusion of R&R, Sandler was awarded the Lloyd's Silver Medal.

== NatWest ==
The Sandler-Rowland partnership that is credited with the Lloyd's rescue was re-formed in October 1999, when Sandler was drafted in to assist Rowland (then Chairman of NatWest) when the bank became the subject of a hostile takeover bid by the Bank of Scotland, a battle later joined by The Royal Bank of Scotland. Sandler was appointed an Executive Director of NatWest and its Chief Operating Officer, and worked alongside Rowland to secure the best possible outcome for shareholders. RBS eventually succeeded in the takeover in March 2000, and the teamwork of Rowland and Sandler won strong praise in the City for the conduct of the defence strategy. Sandler received plaudits for his coolness under fire, but his detractors picked up on his 'overinflated' sense of self.

== Sandler Review of Long-Term Savings ==
In 2001, Sandler was asked by the Chancellor of the Exchequer, Gordon Brown, to conduct a review of Britain's savings industry. The "Sandler Review", published in July 2002, contained many controversial recommendations, but was widely welcomed by the Government, the industry, the FSA and consumer bodies. Treasury Minister Ruth Kelly said: "This report sets out a vision for a simpler, more transparent and more competitive savings industry which the Government endorses".

The principal recommendations of the Sandler Review included a restructuring of with-profit products, a new model for independent advice, tax simplification measures, and a boost to financial literacy education for consumers. All of these recommendations were taken forward by the Government and the FSA. More controversially, the Review put forward a proposal for the creation of a suite of simple savings products, for which regulation of the product would be a lower cost replacement for the existing regulation of the sale process. Whilst this proposal was welcomed by the Tresaury and the FSA, the requirement for these products to be fee-capped ultimately proved to be an insurmountable barrier for the industry.

== Northern Rock ==
In the summer of 2007, mortgage bank Northern Rock suffered a liquidity crisis that required its rescue with a £27 billion government loan; in February 2008, Northern Rock was taken into public ownership (nationalised) and Sandler was appointed Executive Chairman, remaining so until its return to private ownership, at the end of 2011. The appointment was met with some controversy, due to Sandler's £90,000 per month salary and non-domicile status. He oversaw the turnaround of Northern Rock, which included the creation of an asset run-off (the "bad bank"), and a return of the bank to the private sector through its sale to Richard Branson's Virgin Money at the end of 2011.

== Other ==
Sandler has been chairman of a number of companies, mainly in financial services. These include Towry, Ironshore, Phoenix Group, Paternoster, Oxygen Group, Kyte Group and Computacenter. More recently, he has been associated with helping to oversee the global interests of South African entrepreneur Natie Kirsh. Between 2003-08, he chaired the Personal Finance Education Group charity, continuing his interest in promoting higher standards of financial literacy in the UK, and in 2004, he was President of the Chartered Institute of Bankers. Other not-for-profit activities of his have included Trustee of the Royal Opera House, and advisor to Chatham House, where he chairs the Second Century Committee.

In May 2015, he was appointed non-executive chairman of Centaur Media Plc.

Sandler was awarded an honorary CBE in 2004 and a DSc (honoris causa) from City university in 2012.

He met his wife, Susan, when they were students in Cambridge and they married in 1977. They have two adult sons. He lists his interests as golf, fly-fishing and poker.
