= Eaga =

- Company type: Public (LSE: EAGA)
- Industry: Energy
- Founded: 1990
- Defunct: 2011
- Fate: Bought by Carillion
- Headquarters: Newcastle upon Tyne, UK
- Key people: Charles Berry, Chairman; Drew Johnson, CEO
- Revenue: £762.2 million (2010)
- Operating income: £42.4 million (2010)
- Net income: £29.6 million (2010)
- Website: www.eaga.com

Eaga plc was a British company supplying energy efficiency products. It was headquartered in Newcastle upon Tyne. In April 2011 it was acquired by Carillion.

== History ==
The business was founded in 1990 in Newcastle upon Tyne as the Energy Action Grants Agency ('EAGA') Partnership to administer the Home Energy Efficiency Scheme in the local area. In 2000 it was restructured to become an employee owned business. In 2005 it acquired Millfold and in 2006 it acquired Everwarm and established HEAT. It was first listed on the London Stock Exchange in 2007 following a £450 million initial public offering.

In 2008 the BBC appointed Eaga its preferred supplier for the Digital Switchover Help Scheme.

In 2010 Eaga moved a number of their Newcastle staff to Partnership House in Gosforth, a building built by the troubled Northern Rock bank, and purchased by Newcastle City Council. In December 2010 Eaga announced that it would be cutting 700 jobs across the country due to government cutbacks in the Warm Front grant.

In April 2011 it was acquired by Carillion for £306 million. The Eaga name subsequently disappeared as the business took on the Carillion Energy Services brand.

== Operations ==
The Company was organised into the following segments:

- Carbon services
- Heating & renewables
- Managed services
