= Jim Pettigrew =

Scottish business executive (born 1958)

Jim Pettigrew

James Neilson Pettigrew (born 28 July 1958) currently the chairman of the AIB Group Plc, a major Irish banking and financial services group, and has overseen the successful return of the bank from state to public ownership. He is also chairman of RBC Global Asset Management UK Ltd. From 2014 to 2020, he was the chairman of Virgin Money & CYBG PLC, the owners of Clydesdale Bank, Yorkshire Bank. CYBG PLC was formed as part of the demerger with National Australia Bank in early 2016. From 2016 to 2019, he was Chairman of Scottish Financial Enterprise (SFE), the representative body for Scotland's financial services industry, from 2016 to 2019. He also co-chaired the Financial Services Advisory Board (FiSAB) with the First Minister, served on the advisory board of TheCityUK and chaired the Dundee Heritage Trust. He was also chair for Scottish Ballet from 2020 to 2026, guiding the company through the difficult times of the COVID-19 Pandemic and back onto the national and international stage. He is also a former president of ICAS.

== Early life ==
Pettigrew was born in Dundee, Scotland, on 28 July 1958. He attended the High School of Dundee between 1964 and 1976, before going on to study law at the University of Aberdeen where he gained an LL.B in 1979. He then undertook a post graduate Accountancy qualification at the University of Glasgow obtaining his Dip. Acc in 1980. He went on to qualify as a Chartered Accountant with Ernst and Young before moving into the corporate sector.

== Career history ==
In 1988, Pettigrew joined Sedgwick Group plc, a member of the FTSE 100, rising to become group treasurer and stayed until December 1998, at which point he was deputy group CFO.

In January 1999, he joined ICAP plc, which became a FTSE 100 company and the world's largest specialist inter-dealer broker, as group finance director.

He was chief operating and financial officer of Ashmore Group plc from 2006 to 2007, where he played an important role supporting the initial public offering and managing the post IPO process both internally and externally.

Pettigrew then became chief executive officer of CMC Markets plc in October 2007, having previously served as a non-executive director.

Since leaving CMC Markets plc in 2009, Pettigrew has been building a portfolio of non-executive director appointments; with a focus on the Financial Services and Insurance sectors. He is currently serving on the below boards:

- Chairman of AIB Group Plc.
- Chairman of RBC Ltd (Europe)

He previously held the following board positions:

- Chairman of Scottish Ballet
- Chairman of The Edinburgh Investment Trust PLC
- Chairman of BlueBay Asset Management (Services) Ltd and BlueBay Asset Management LLP (members of the RBC Group)
- Chairman of Dundee Heritage Trust
- Chairman of Virgin Money/Clydesdale Bank/CYBG PLC
- Chairman of Miton Group PLC
- Chairman of Scottish Financial Enterprise
- Co-chair of FiSAB the Financial Services Advisory Board
- Interim chairman and senior independent non-executive director of Rathbone Brothers Plc
- SID at Crest Nicholson Holdings PLC
- Audit Chair at Aberdeen Asset Management plc
- Risk Chair at Hermes
- NED at Aon UK Ltd
- NED at CMC Markets plc
- Member of City UK advisory board

== Outside interests ==
Pettigrew has served on the foundation board helping preserve the world's last sea-going paddle steamer – The Waverley.
