= Church House Investments =

Company based in Sherborne, Dorset, UK

- Company type: Limited
- Founded: 1997
- Headquarters: Sherborne, United Kingdom
- Website: www.ch-investments.co.uk

Church House Investments Limited is a private British investment management company based in Sherborne, United Kingdom. Church House Investments and Church House Trust were corporately linked companies until Virgin Money acquired Church House Trust plc in 2010.

== History ==
=== Origins ===
The origins of Church House can be traced back to 1792 when Edward Batten formed Messrs. Batten & Co. Batten was the senior of three partners and was later joined by his son John Batten in 1829. After a number of mergers and acquisitions in the nineteenth and early twentieth century the bank grew, until a number of the members of the Batten family were casualties of the First World War, leading to the company being purchased by what became the Westminster Bank.

=== The current companies – Church House Trust and Church House Investments ===
In 1924 Lieutenant Colonel Bill Batten assumed control of the legal practice, and then in 1978 the bank was re-founded. The name of Church House comes from the Queen Anne house just opposite St. John's parish church in the centre of Yeovil that was first occupied by Nathaniel Batten in 1720. The bank moved from the building in 1999 to a former glove factory, having grown too large for the old premises. There are two companies using the Church House brand; Church House Trust and Church House Investments. The current Church House Investments company was incorporated on 3 December 1997.

Following Richard Branson's Virgin Money acquisition of Church House Trust for £12.3 million in 2010, Church House Investments continued to operate independently. At the time of the sale of Church House Trust to Virgin Money there was a management buyout of this company, the investment arm of Church House. Burges Salmon advised on the deal. The company currently offers investment management services including pension funds, ISAs, trusts and charitable foundations. It relocated from its Yeovil office to Sherborne, Dorset in November 2013.
