= James Lumsden (Lord Provost, died 1879) =

Scottish stationer and merchant

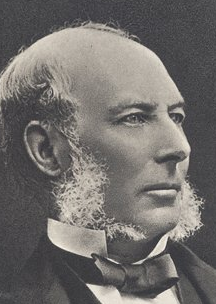
Sir James Lumsden

Sir James Lumsden DL (18 June 1808–22 March 1879) was a Scottish stationer and merchant who served as Lord Provost of Glasgow from 1866 to 1869. He was known as the Knight of Arden.

== History ==
The eldest son of James Lumsden who served as Lord Provost of Glasgow from 1843 to 1846, he was born at 60 Queen Street, Glasgow on 18 June 1808. His mother was Margaret Mirlees. He had one younger brother, known as George Lumsden of Drumsheugh Gardens. He was educated at Glasgow Grammar School. James matriculated at Glasgow University in 1821 but did not graduate.

He joined the family publishing and stationery business of James Lumsden & Son, and was made a full partner in 1834. By 1840 he had his own house at 121 Bath Street.

He was chairman of the Clydesdale Bank from 1851 until his death. He was also chairman of the Glasgow and South Western Railway and the Clyde Navigation Trust. He was the final chairman of the Clyde Shipping Company before it was sold in 1857. A Liberal politician, he joined the Glasgow town Council in 1860, serving as Lord Provost from 1866 to 1869. He was knighted in 1868 in a ceremony linked to the laying of the foundation of the new university buildings at Gilmorehill. His title Sir James Lumsden of Arden reflected the estate of Arden near Loch Lomond which he had purchased in 1867. In later life he lived at 124 Bath Street. He died in Glasgow on 22 March 1879.
