= James Pettigrew =

James Pettigrew may refer to:

- James Bell Pettigrew (1832–1908), Scottish anatomist and amateur naturalist, aviation pioneer and museum curator
- J. Johnston Pettigrew (1828–1863), American author, lawyer, linguist, diplomat, and soldier
  - SS James J. Pettigrew, a Liberty ship
- Jim Pettigrew (born 1958), chairman of CYBG PLC
