= Meso finance =

Meso-finance is a relatively new concept in the financing world. Meso-finance loans start from an amount of 1000 euro and are specifically meant for small-and medium-sized enterprises.

SMEs that are in need of extra capital are often too large for micro credits due to their higher level of firm complexity compared to small enterprises, but too small for regular loans from a bank. Banks often refuse loan requests from SMEs, due to a lack of in-depth accounting data and make SME finance very difficult. Since the reported financial information is often very basic, this means that these financial overviews often do not live up to the requirements set by banks. As a result, SMEs often miss out on capital access from either micro finance, or regular bank loans. Therefore, the SME sector is also named the 'missing middle'. Currently, this gap accounts for an amount of $0.7trillion.
