= James Lumsden (Lord Provost, died 1856) =

Scottish stationer and merchant (1778–1856)

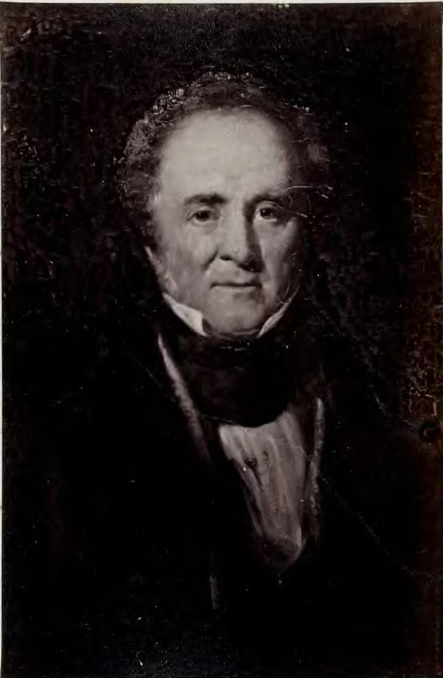
- portrait by Daniel Macnee
- Born: 13 November 1778; Glasgow
- Died: 16 May 1856 (aged 77); Glasgow
- Alma mater: High School of Glasgow
- Children: James Lumsden
- Position held: Lord Provost of Glasgow (1843–1846)

James Lumsden (1778–1856) was a Scottish stationer and merchant who served as Lord Provost of Glasgow from 1843 to 1846.

== Life ==
He was born on 13 November 1778 in Glasgow, the son of James Lumsden, an engraver and publisher, and his wife, Jean Adamson. The family lived in a second floor flat in Craigs Land at the head of the Old Wynd in central Glasgow. He was educated at Glasgow Grammar School. Their family publishing firm J. Lumsden and Son was founded in 1783 and specialised in children's books.

In 1797 he was "elected" knight companion of the Coul Club under the pseudonym of Christopher Copperplate.

When his father retired in 1810, he then took over the publishing firm.

In 1812 he was one of the several people including Henry Bell and Sir Walter Scott on the maiden voyage of the Comet.

He developed the business James Lumsden & Son based at 20 Queen Street in Glasgow. In 1840 he was living at 208 St Vincent Street.

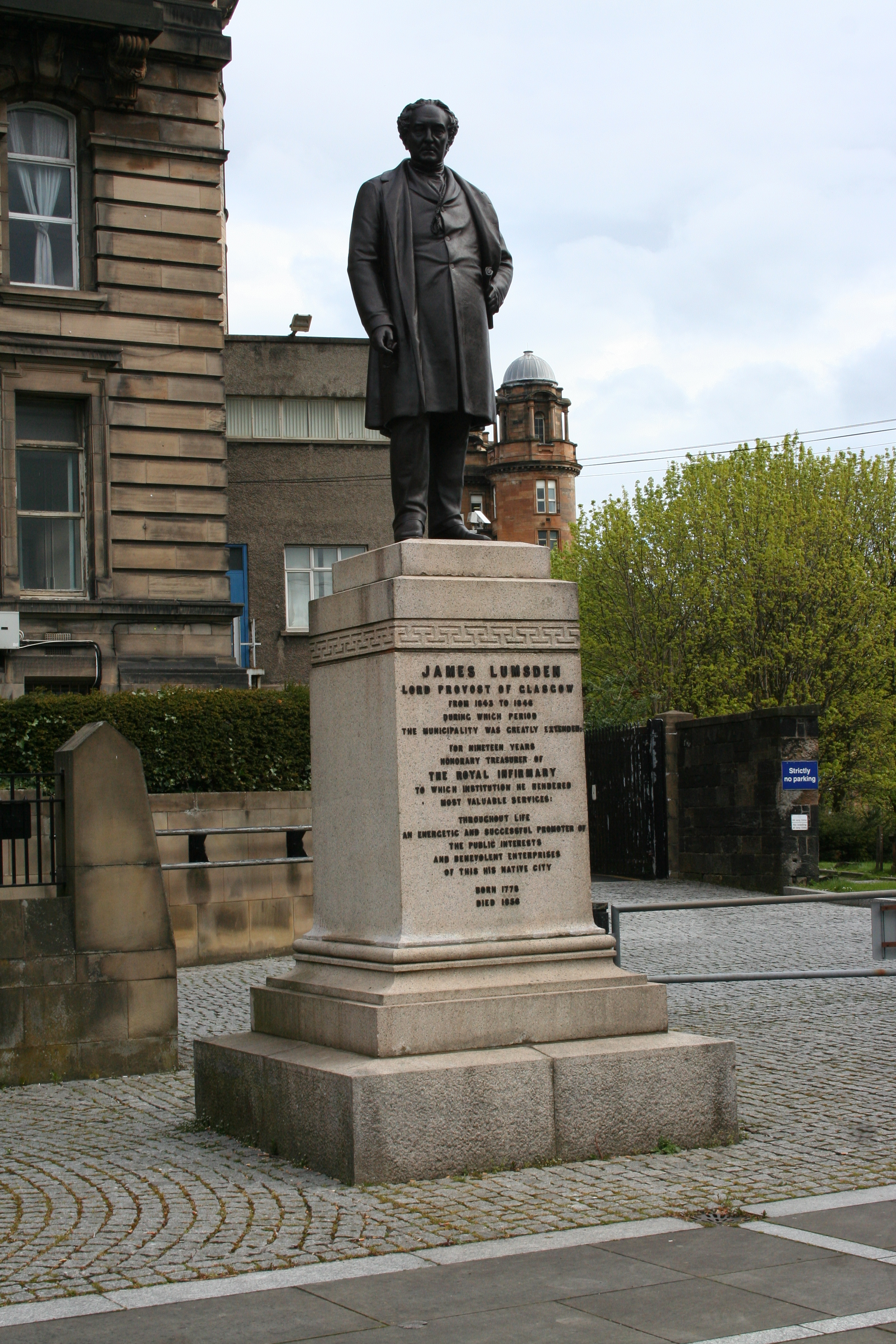
Statue of Lumsden at Cathedral Square, Glasgow

In 1838 he was one of the founders of the Clydesdale Bank. He served on Glasgow Town Council from 1833 and was elected Lord Provost of Glasgow from 1843 to 1846, having previously been a Town councillor and baillie, and a commissioner of the City of Glasgow Police. His most important achievement as Lord Provost was the crearion of the Glasgow School of Design.

He retired in 1852 and died on 16 May 1856. He was buried in the churchyard of Glasgow Cathedral.

== Artistic recognition ==
A statue to his memory, designed by John Mossman, stands near the cathedral in front of Glasgow Royal Infirmary, of which both he and his brother Lachlan were major benefactors. He was also portrayed by Sir Daniel Macnee.

== Family ==
He married Margaret Gourlay. They had two sons, James and George, who both initially joined the family firm. James Jr was head of the Clydesdale Bank from 1851 until his death, and was also Lord Provost of Glasgow from 1866 to 1869. He was knighted in 1868 as Sir James Lumsden of Arden.
