= Yorkshire Bank =

Retail bank in the United Kingdom

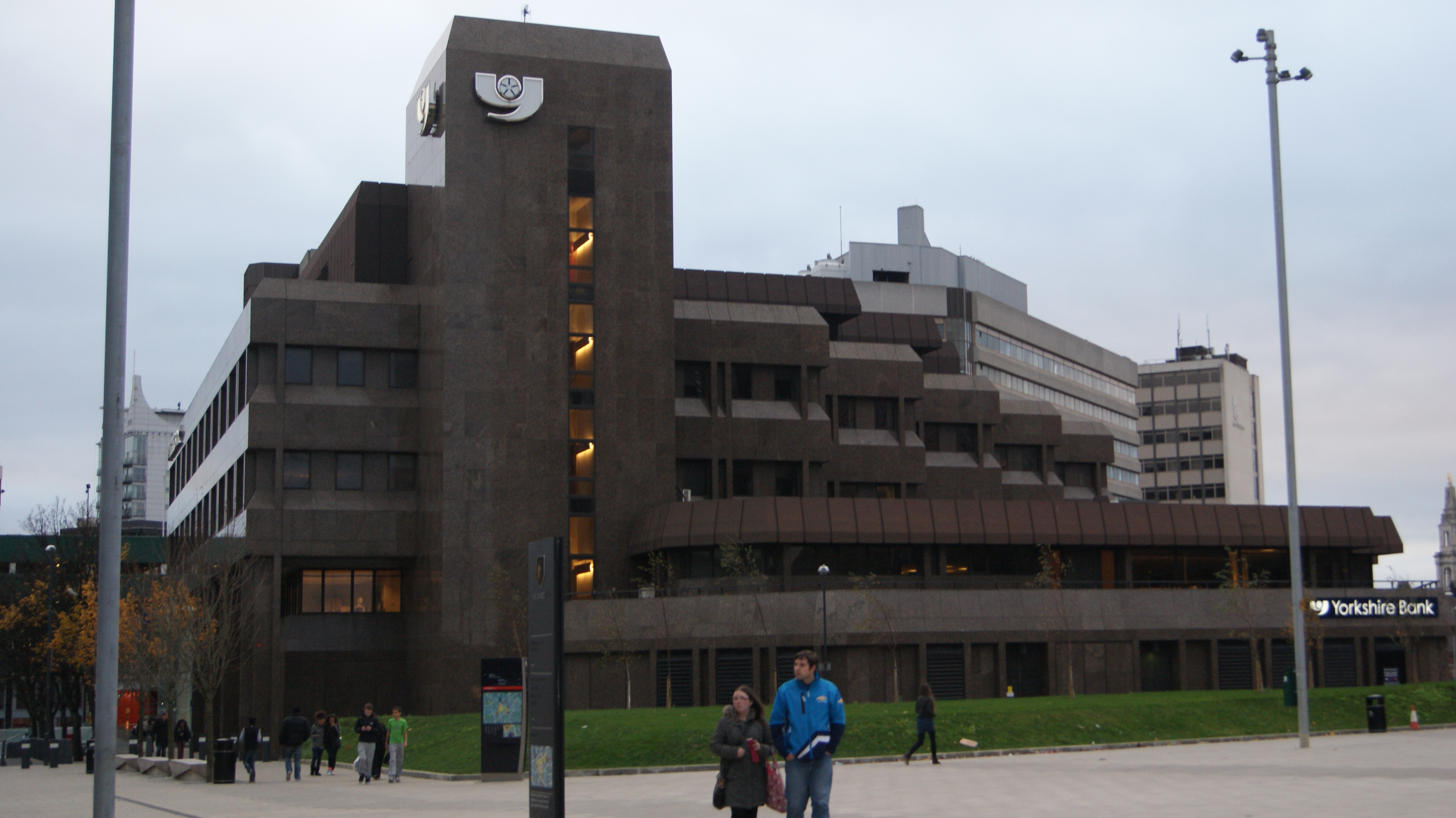
- The former headquarters of Yorkshire Bank on Merrion Way, Leeds
- Type: Trading name
- Industry: Banking, Financial services
- Founded: 1 May 1859; 167 years ago Halifax, West Yorkshire
- Founder: Edward Akroyd
- Headquarters: Leeds, England, UK
- Key people: James Pettigrew (Chairman)
- Services: Retail banking SME banking
- Parent: Clydesdale Bank plc
- Website: ybonline.co.uk

Yorkshire Bank was a banking brand in England.

The Yorkshire Bank was founded in 1859 as the West Riding of Yorkshire Provident Society and Penny Savings Society but the Provident Society was soon abandoned and the Bank then traded as the West Riding of Yorkshire Penny Savings Bank. After further abbreviations, its present name was adopted in 1959.

The Bank's model was unique in that it directly owned an extensive network of penny banks, remitting funds into a Central Office. By the late nineteenth century, it was larger than any of the Trustee Savings Banks. However, the Bank faced a potential withdrawal of savings in 1911 and was acquired by a consortium of clearing banks.

The Bank was acquired by National Australia Bank (NAB) in 1990 and was merged into another NAB subsidiary, Clydesdale Bank in 2005, continuing to operate as a distinct trading division. In 2016 NAB divested its UK operations as CYBG plc which went on to acquire Virgin Money plc in 2018. Subsequently the Yorkshire Bank name was phased out with all branches rebranded as Virgin Money.

== History ==
=== Formation ===
Colonel Edward Akroyd is regarded as the initiator of the Bank; he was a prominent Halifax industrialist, head of the family woollen firm of James Akroyd & Son, magistrate and Member of Parliament. His philanthropic work led him to the importance of savings for the working class, much as the founders of the savings banks and early penny banks had done decades before. His original intention was to establish both a provident society and a penny bank within the same institution. In May 1856, Akroyd circulated a pamphlet to prominent figures in the county, leading to a public meeting in November at the Philosophical Hall, Leeds. A committee was formed to bring into being the West Riding of Yorkshire Provident Society and Penny Savings Society, with funds raised to finance both parts. In the event, the Provident Society proved uncompetitive with the large societies and it soon closed; the Bank then traded as the West Riding of Yorkshire Penny Savings Bank.

=== The unique Yorkshire concept ===
The Yorkshire Bank was different from other savings banks. At the bottom of the savings chain stood the penny banks, doing what their name implied: accepting very small sums from the poorest local people. As their funds increased, they would be deposited with the trustee savings banks. The relationship between the penny banks and the savings banks could be close, with a savings bank acting as a receiving agency for a number of penny banks in its area. (The Glasgow Savings Bank, for instance, had 97 of these by 1870.) What Akroyd envisaged was the Yorkshire forming and owning the local penny banks, and also being the receiving agent for their surplus funds. He began a campaign "to form a great network of penny banks and provident societies in the West Riding, guaranteed by the local gentry and industrialists". Akroyd saw the advantage of a central co-ordinating body for penny banks in a wide district; this could have been found in the Trustee Savings Banks, but Akroyd distrusted them. He wanted freedom of investment of the funds, and recognised that they could not grow just from the savings of the poor: the Bank needed small traders also.

Considerable time was taken to establish the organisation. A key appointment in 1858 was of Peter Bent as accountant, later to become the Bank's first general manager. Finally, in May 1859 the Central Office was ready and the Bank registered under the Friendly Society Acts. In the first month of its existence, two branches opened: Dewsbury and Oxenhope; by the end of the year there were 24 branches, and a year later there were 128, with total deposits of £23.000. These branches opened one evening a week, usually for an hour or two, and were generally known as "evening branches". By the end of 1860 the abortive Provident Society had been abandoned and it was decided to extend the Bank coverage from the West Riding to the whole county.

=== Incorporation and 19th century growth ===
The 1863 Savings Act caused problems: the Bank was prevented from using the word "savings" in its title without being registered under the Act. Registration was not acceptable to the trustees, who did not want the restrictions it brought: e.g. on the maximum amount an individual investor could deposit (on the face of it, a strange objection from a penny bank). The Bank therefore opted for registration with the Board of Trade, but still had to drop the word "savings" from its name. By 1871, the Bank finally obtained its certificate of registration and duly changed its name to the Yorkshire Penny Bank.

In 1865, pressure of business in the Leeds branches had encouraged the Central Office to open a branch on its premises; unlike all the other branches, this opened daily. It was immediately successful: after one year, deposits were £2,000 and by 1870 they had risen to £25,000. Once the Bank had been registered, it used the Central Office branch as a model for the future branch structure. Gradually, additional daily branches were opened, starting with Bradford (1872), Halifax (1876) and Sheffield (1878). At the same time, new evening branches continued to be opened and these peaked at 955 in 1894; by then, there were 16 full branches and these more than doubled to 36 by 1900. Also from 1872, cheque books were introduced to encourage small traders to become customers and "to dispel the common view that the Bank existed only for the small savings of children and the poorer classes". Despite that encouragement to small traders, the Bank actively encouraged accounts that had grown too large to switch to commercial banks.

With time came changes in the Bank's leadership. Ackroyd resigned as President in 1879, and in 1891 Peter Bent died aged 64. He had become the first general manager in 1877 and under his guidance, deposits had risen to £5.7 million. This compared with the Glasgow Savings Bank, then the largest is the country, which had deposits "in excess of £3 million" in 1878. Bent's son-in-law Henry Sellers took over and remained general manager until 1914. He introduced a stocks and shares department to the Bank and, as a result of the Boer War, developed a network of international correspondents. By 1908, deposits had risen to £17 million.

=== The 1911 collapse ===
In 1911, the Bank's deposits of £18.5 million were supported by reserves of only £468,000. Although these deposits were repayable on demand, the funds were largely invested in fixed rate government securities, which, although liquid, fluctuated in value. The directors feared that a fall in the value of investments could threaten a run on the bank. In a rescue sponsored by the Bank of England, the Yorkshire Penny Bank was acquired by a consortium of eleven clearing banks. Additional capital of £11.5 million was injected into the Bank and further guarantees given to cover potential losses. The old Board was replaced and a new bank of the same name was formed. The eventual deficiency of £2.5 million was greater than the bank's shareholders' guarantees, and further Government guarantees were obtained.

=== Recovery ===
Despite the Bank's philanthropic origins, the new shareholders required it to be profitable. The operational limits of 10 miles over the border were removed and, in another change, overdrafts were allowed. However, the inter-war years were "not distinguished by any great progress": between 1920 and 1932 deposits stood at around £29 million. In the late 1920s and early 1930s a few new branches were opened, and by 1939 deposits had grown to £39 million. However, it proved difficult to open new branches because of complaints from its shareholders that the Yorkshire was competing with their existing business. Helped by inflation, the Bank's deposits rose to £95 million in 1948, the year that Henry Ashworth became general manager. However, the Bank was still trying to combine the strengths of the local penny banks with the requirements of a modern commercial institution. There were still 677 evening branches; these were deemed out of date and by 1955 only 79 remained. Instead, Ashworth wanted to increase lending to customers; and in 1959 the word "Penny", widely thought to be off-putting to large customers, was finally dropped from the Bank's title, leaving just the simple Yorkshire Bank Ltd.

=== The 1952 reorganisation ===
Despite Ashworth's intentions, the bank's funds were still largely invested in British Government securities ("gilts"); only 4 per cent of assets were in overdrafts. As in 1911, falling gilt values again threatened a substantial deficit, and by 1952 another increase in capital was required. Midland Bank held 37.5% of the shares and did not wish to continue, selling its holding to the other members of the consortium, now down to seven. The clearing bank mergers of 1968 further reduced the number of shareholders down to four: National Westminster, Barclays, Lloyds Bank and Williams & Glyn. The shift in the asset structure continued and by 1970 overdrafts had reached £100 million, rising to £337 million in 1979, or 54% of assets, a far cry from the 4% of 1952.

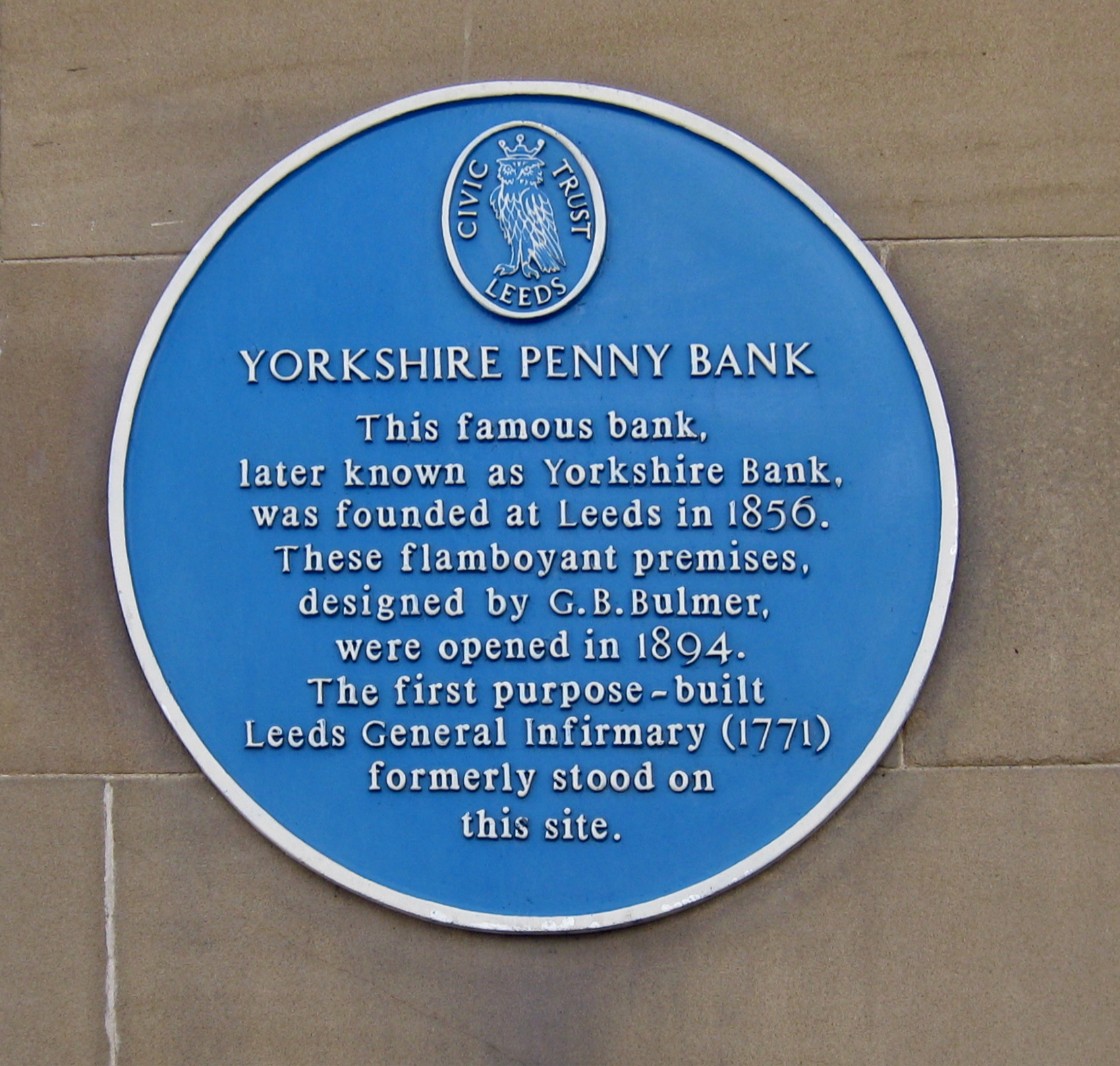
Yorkshire Penny Bank blue plaque

=== Yorkshire Bank Ltd ===
In its centenary year of 1959, the bank's name changed to Yorkshire Bank Limited. During the 1970s the bank became one of the first to offer fee free banking whilst in credit, a move that took bigger rivals a decade to follow. In 1982, it adopted public limited company status.

During the miners' strike from 1984 to 1985, the bank offered miners who were mortgage holders a deferment, allowing them to postpone payments for the duration of the dispute. The strike took place in the bank's heartland and many miners were customers, having been encouraged by the National Coal Board to have their pay mandated to a bank account.

A high street branch of the Yorkshire Bank in Peterborough

=== Acquisition by National Australia Bank ===
In 1990, the National Australia Bank Group acquired the bank from the consortium of owning banks which, after mergers and acquisitions, were the National Westminster Bank (holders of 40%), Barclays Bank (32%), Lloyds Bank (20%), and Royal Bank of Scotland (8%). The price paid was £1 billion and the bank joined National Australia Bank's other European businesses, Clydesdale Bank (Scotland) and Northern Bank (which operated in both jurisdictions in Ireland).

In May 2005, the National Australia Bank announced its intention to merge the Yorkshire Bank with the Clydesdale under one operating licence, in which the former would be a trading name of the latter. Both operate under separate identities although the Clydesdale brand is the one that has been used in further expansion into the south of England (Northern Bank was sold to Danske Bank of Denmark along with its operations in the Republic of Ireland, the National Irish Bank). At the same time 40 branches were closed, a reduction of a fifth of the Yorkshire Bank network.

In 2006 underlying profit rose 16.7 per cent to £454 million compared with a year earlier, while post-tax earnings climbed 12.8 per cent to £229 million. Total income was up 8.7 per cent at £1,193 million, while net interest income climbed 14.6 per cent to £769 million.

In April 2012, National Australia Bank completed a strategic review of its businesses in the United Kingdom and decided to scale back operations, completely stopping Commercial Property Investment lending and closing 29 Financial Solutions Centres, with the resultant loss of 1,400 jobs over three years.

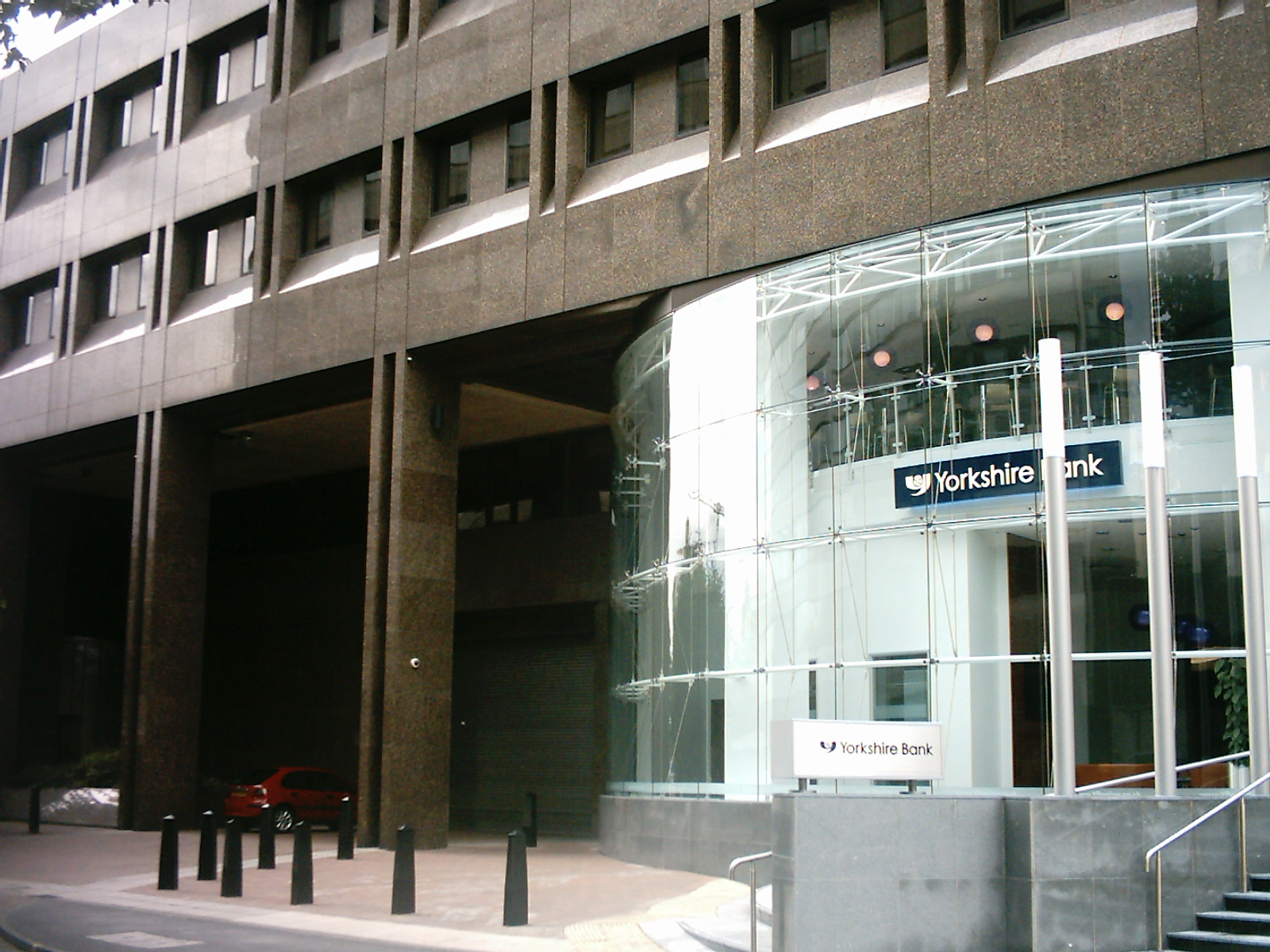
The former Yorkshire Bank headquarters in Leeds in 2008

In July 2013, Yorkshire Bank forgot to renew its DNS server domain name, leading to customers being unable to log onto its website for a number of days. Yorkshire Bank blamed individual ISPs saying they had not refreshed their servers. On 2 September 2014 the bank suffered more IT related issues as its systems left customers unable to make or receive payments for a period of time.

=== CYBG plc ===
National Australia Bank confirmed in October 2014 that it planned to leave the United Kingdom and was considering a number of options for Yorkshire and Clydesdale banks, including a possible stock-market listing. In October 2015 NAB announced that it would float Clydesdale Bank plc, including Yorkshire Bank, on the London Stock Exchange in February 2016 through an initial public offering, with an aim of raising £2 billion.

Clydesdale Bank plc's newly formed holding company CYBG plc began conditional trading on the LSE and the Australian Securities Exchange on 3 February 2016, and began trading unconditionally from 8 February 2016.

=== Transition to Virgin Money ===
In June 2018 CYBG plc announced it would acquire Virgin Money for £1.7 billion in an all-stock deal. Almost one in six employees was expected to lose their jobs in the takeover, which would result in retail customers being migrated to the Virgin Money brand over three years.

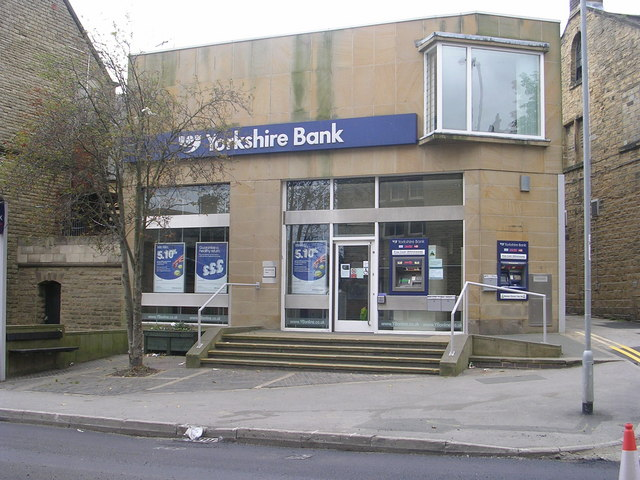
Yorkshire Bank in Pudsey in 2009

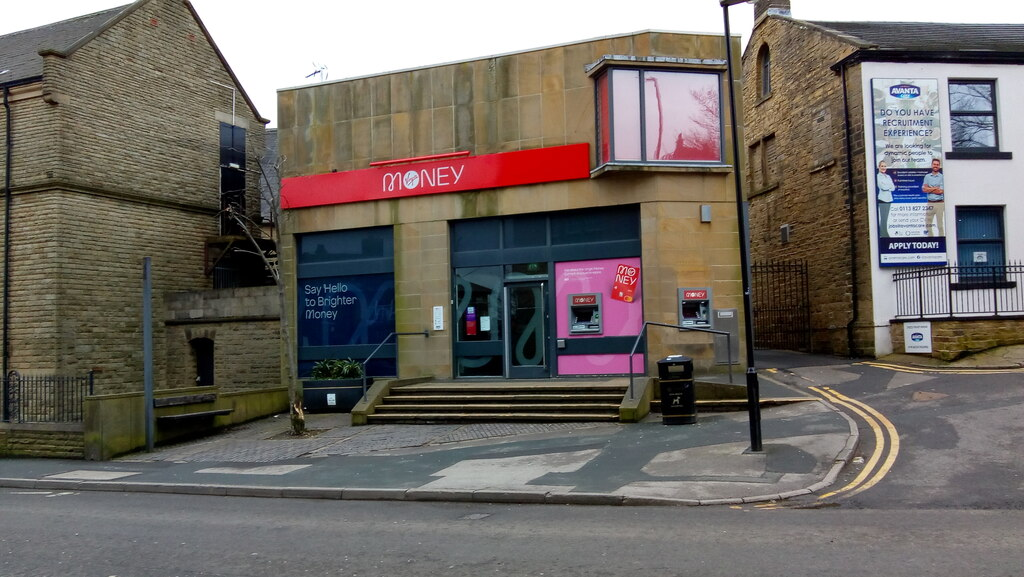
The Yorkshire Bank in Pudsey after rebranding as Virgin Money in 2021

In June 2019 CYBG plc announced its plans to consolidate its businesses under the Virgin Money brand. B and Yorkshire Bank, which exist as trading divisions of Clydesdale Bank plc, would begin to use the Virgin Money name in early 2020 and Clydesdale Bank to use the new name between late 2020 and early 2021. In September 2019 Yorkshire Bank confirmed it would be leaving its Leeds headquarters, with two hundred employees being relocated to the bank's flagship branch on Briggate. In preparation for rebranding, the existing Virgin Money plc was merged into the existing Clydesdale Bank plc on 21 October 2019.

== See also ==
- List of banks in the United Kingdom
