= Bank and Clients =

1978–2021 British private bank

Bank and Clients plc
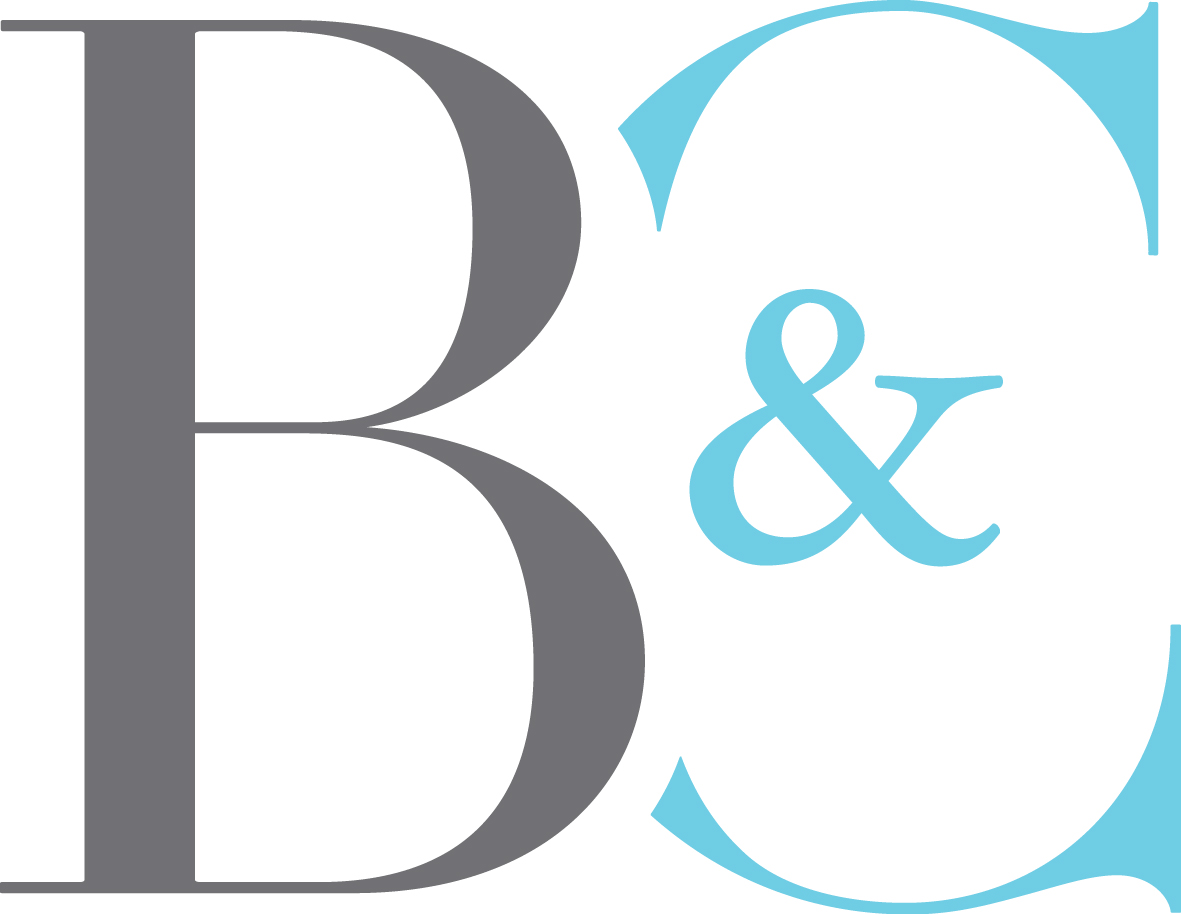
- Type: Subsidiary
- Predecessor: Church House Trust
- Founded: 1978
- Defunct: 2021
- Headquarters: London (Registered Office), England
- Key people: Lord Strathclyde (Non-executive Chairman)
- Parent: Ocean Industries S.A.
- Website: bankandclients.com at the Wayback Machine (archived 18 September 2021)

Bank and Clients plc was a British private bank, which was formed by combining: Church House Trust, a retail bank founded in 1978 and Ocean Capital, a specialist corporate lender founded in 2002. B&C was based in London, England.

In January 2010 the former Church House Trust plc was acquired by Virgin Money as a way for the Virgin Group to gain a banking licence to begin a retail banking operation. The investments division was not included in the acquisition, and continues to operate independently as Church House Investments in Sherborne.

Virgin Money sold Church House to Ocean Industries S.A. in 2014, and it was merged with Ocean Capital to become Bank and Clients. Former HSBC Mexico Chief Executive Officer Sandy Flockhart was named chairman in December 2014, and was replaced in early 2016 by the Conservative peer, Lord Strathclyde.

== History ==
=== Origins ===
The origins of Church House can be traced back to 1792 when Edward Batten formed Messrs. Batten & Co. Batten was the senior of three partners and was later joined by his son John Batten in 1829. After a number of mergers and acquisitions in the nineteenth and early twentieth century the bank grew, until a number of the members of the Batten family were casualties of the First World War, leading to the company being purchased by what became the Westminster Bank.

In 1924 Lieutenant Colonel Bill Batten assumed control of the legal practice, and then in 1978 the bank was re-founded. The name of Church House came from the Queen Anne house just opposite St. John's parish church in the centre of Yeovil that was first occupied by Nathaniel Batten in 1720. The bank moved from the building in 1999 to a former glove factory, having grown too large for the old premises.

=== Acquisitions and rebrand ===
On 8 January 2010 Richard Branson's Virgin Money announced the acquisition of Church House Trust for £12.3 million, giving Virgin a small foothold in the UK banking market. The bank was due to be renamed under the Virgin brand. Virgin Money did not purchase Church House Investments, and that company continues to operate independently.

Following Virgin's purchase of Church House Trust the company was renamed Virgin Bank Ltd. In January 2012 Virgin Money bought Northern Rock, and renamed Virgin Bank Ltd again as Church House Trust Limited.

On 18 December 2012 Virgin agreed to sell Church House Trust Limited to SAV Credit subject to FSA approval. The sale was not completed.

On 30 November 2014 Church House Trust Limited was sold to Ocean Industries S.A. for £13 million. The company was renamed Bank and Clients after the purchase by Ocean in December 2014.

=== Demise ===
In April 2019, the bank announced the temporary withdrawal of its range of mortgage products from the market. It was then announced that on 31 January 2020 Al Ahli Bank of Kuwait had concluded a buy and sell agreement for the full acquisition of Bank and Clients for an undisclosed sum. However, the deal failed to progress, with Bank and Clients' website then confirming that they are no longer offer mortgages or savings.

On 1 February 2021, it was announced that Claire Bridel had resigned as CEO, with Nicole Coll taking the position of executive director.

It was then announced on 8 February 2021 that Tandem Money had agreed to purchase the remaining B&C mortgage book, consisting of 300 B&C customers for an undisclosed amount. In September 2021, the Bank of England confirmed B&C had applied to cancel their banking licence.

On 8 January 2022, the company had appointed liquidators and had fully ceased trading.
