= Virgin Money UK =

UK-based bank and financial services company

Virgin Money

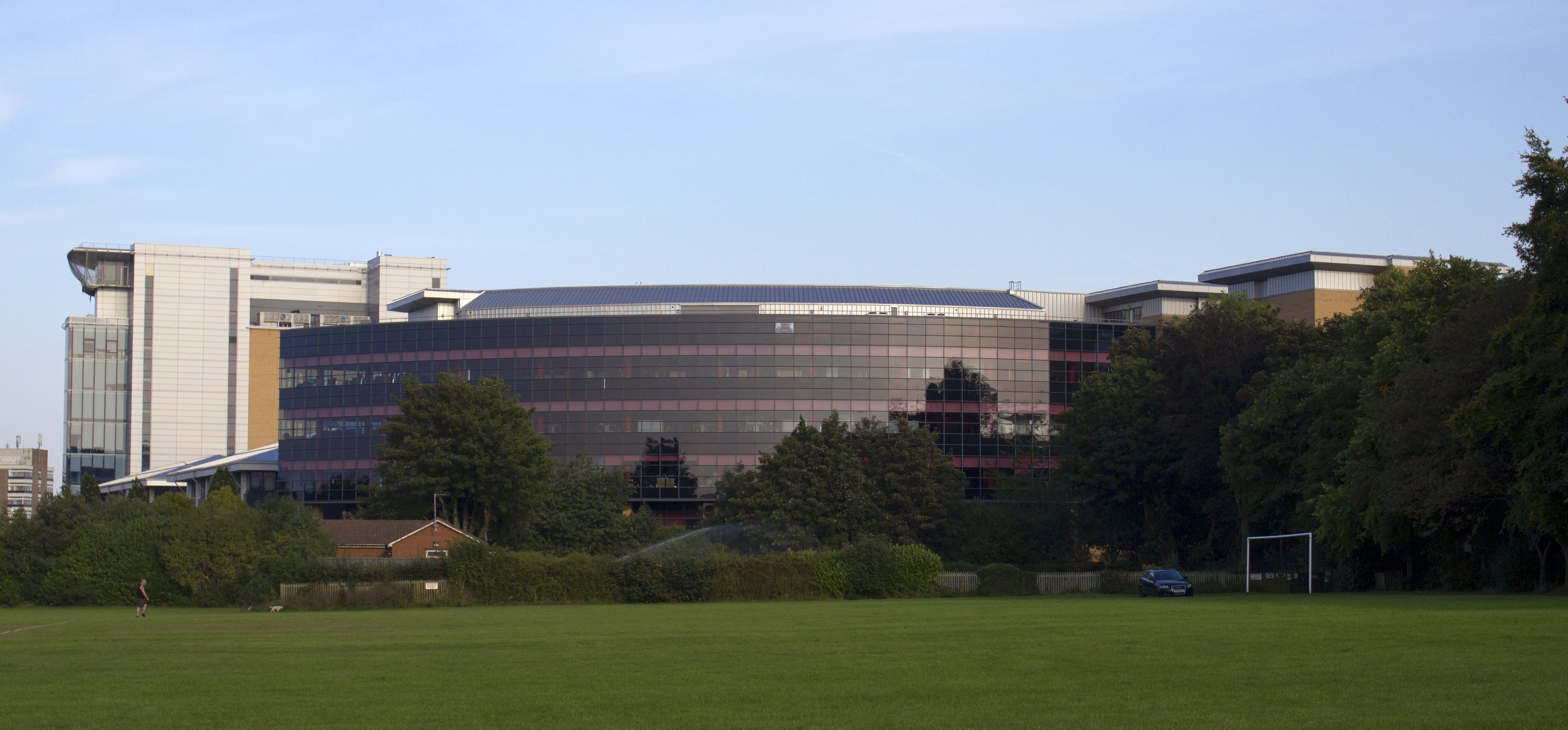
- The headquarters of Virgin Money in Jubilee House, Newcastle upon Tyne
- Formerly: CYBG plc, Virgin Money UK plc
- Type: Trading name
- Industry: Banking, Financial services
- Founded: 3 March 1995; 31 years ago (brand); 1 October 2015; 11 years ago (group)
- Founder: Richard Branson (brand)
- Headquarters: Newcastle upon Tyne, England
- Number of locations: 91 (2021)
- Key people: James Pettigrew (Chairman); Chris Rhodes (CEO)
- Services: Retail banking SME banking
- Revenue: ▲£1.827 billion (2023)
- Operating income: ▼£345 million (2023)
- Net income: ▼£246 million (2023)
- Total assets: ▼£91.786 billion (2023)
- Total equity: ▼£5.607 billion (2023)
- Owner: Nationwide Building Society
- Number of employees: 7,166 (2023)
- Website: uk.virginmoney.com

Virgin Money is a British banking and financial services brand. It has been owned by Nationwide Building Society since 1 October 2024.

The Virgin Money brand was founded by Richard Branson in March 1995. It was originally known as Virgin Direct, and pioneered index tracking by launching a value personal equity plan into the market. In the 2000s Virgin Money expanded its operations around the world. Virgin Money announced plans to become a retail bank, and attempted to purchase Northern Rock in 2007 before it was nationalised by the British Government. Virgin applied for its own banking licence from the Financial Services Authority in 2009, and gained one through the acquisition of Church House Trust the following year. Virgin bought Northern Rock in January 2012 and rebranded the business as Virgin Money.

In June 2018, Virgin Money agreed to a takeover by CYBG plc (formed by National Australia Bank (NAB), out of several of its UK subsidiaries, in February 2016) which was completed in October 2018. Virgin Money was merged into Clydesdale Bank plc on 21 October 2019, continuing as a trading name and operating under Clydesdale Bank plc's banking licence. It was planned that Virgin Money UK would phase out the Clydesdale Bank, Yorkshire Bank and B brands in favour of the Virgin Money brand. However, in March 2024, the bank's parent company agreed to be acquired by Nationwide Building Society in a £2.9 billion deal that was completed on 1 October 2024 and will see the Virgin Money brand name being phased out by 2030.

== History ==
=== Formation of Virgin Money UK ===
Virgin Money UK was launched as Virgin Direct Personal Financial Services in partnership with Norwich Union on 3 March 1995 offering personal equity plans and launched Virgin One, in a partnership with the Royal Bank of Scotland (RBS), in 1997. That year, Australia's AMP bought Norwich Union's 50% stake in Virgin Direct. In 2000, virginmoney.com was launched as a price comparison website. RBS bought out Virgin's stake in the One Account joint venture in 2001.

In 2002, Virgin Direct merged with virginmoney.com to form the current company. Virgin Money expanded its operations around the world in the 2000s. The Virgin Group took 100% ownership of Virgin Money in April 2004, buying the remaining 50% stake for £90 million from AMP/HHG.

In 2007, Virgin made a bid to acquire the Northern Rock bank; this initial bid failed. In an interview with The Times on 9 March 2009, Branson stated that he still hoped that Virgin Money would expand its operations into the banking sector, saying "We are going to get back into the mortgage business and we will become a bank either by acquisition or by getting our own banking licence. You will see us become a consumer bank within the next couple of years."

In October 2009, Virgin Money applied to the Financial Services Authority for a full banking licence. In February 2011 they announced their intention to lease a large office in Edinburgh.

On 8 January 2010, Virgin Money announced the acquisition of Church House Trust for £12.3 million, giving Virgin a small foothold in the UK banking market. Although Church House Trust had no branches, it provided Virgin with a banking licence. As part of the acquisition, Virgin agreed to invest a further £37.3 million of new capital into the business. On 26 January the deal was declared unconditional.

In late January, Sir Brian Pitman became the Chairman of Virgin Money; Pitman had previously been an advisor to Virgin during the attempted buyout of Northern Rock in 2007. In February Pitman stated that the company was interested in acquiring some branches of other banks which lie in good locations; branches belonging to the RBS and Lloyds were reported as possible candidates. Following Pitman's death Sir David Clementi was appointed Chairman. In April 2010, Wilbur Ross invested £100 million in Virgin Money for a 21% stake in the company. Wilbur Ross had previously supported Virgin Money in its previous bid for Northern Rock. James Lockhart, Vice Chairman of WL Ross & Co, joined the Virgin Money board.

=== Acquisition of Northern Rock plc ===
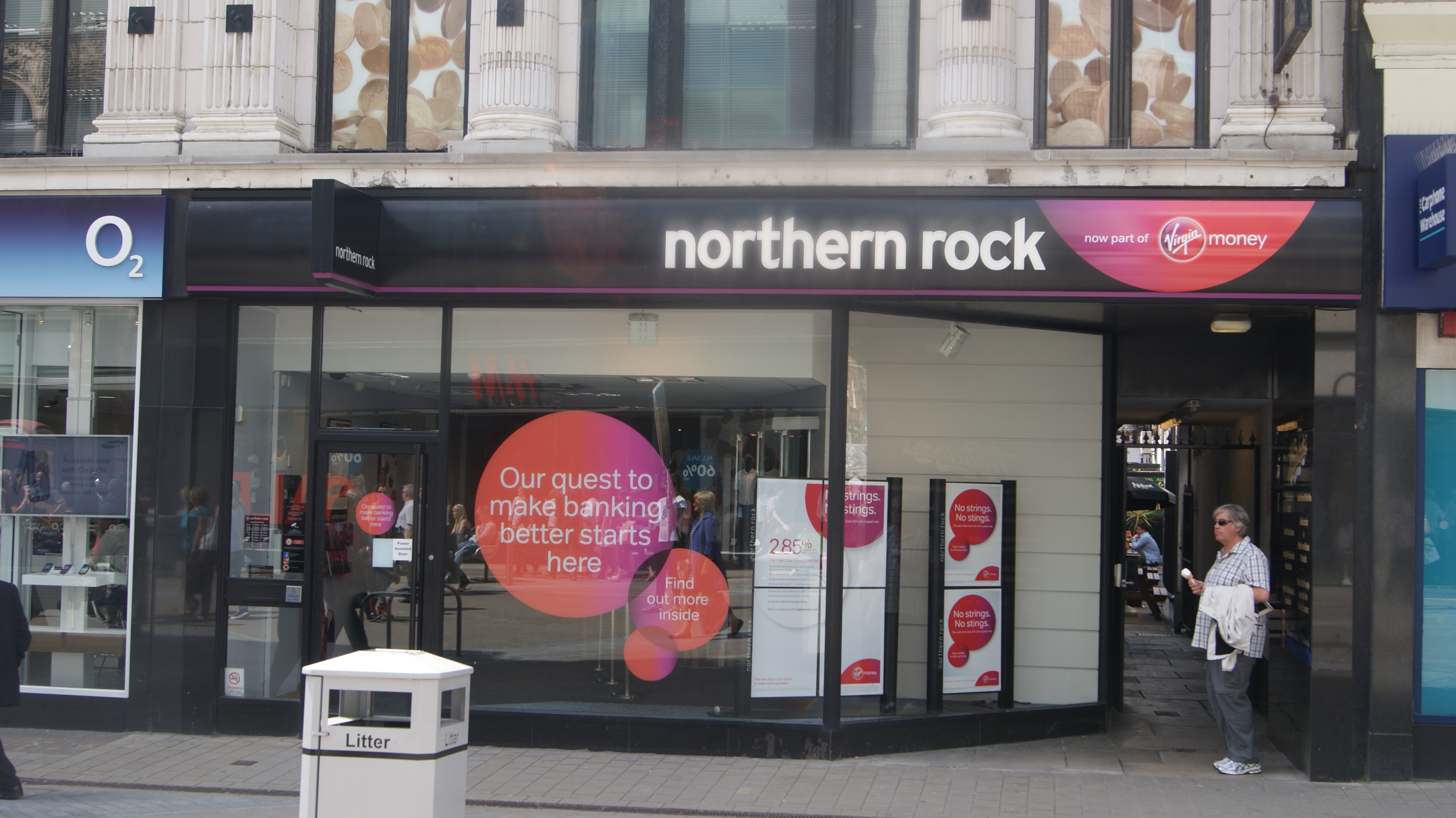
A branch of the Northern Rock with Virgin Money branding on Briggate in Leeds

On 13 October 2007, Sir Richard Branson announced that Virgin Group were putting together a consortium of financiers to propose to plough millions into the troubled Northern Rock bank and in return take an approximate 30% stake in the business, bringing the current financial products offered by Virgin and combining them with Northern Rock's own financial products. By February 2008, Virgin were the favoured bidders for the bank and announced in its official submission to the government that, if successful, they would have merged Northern Rock and Virgin Money, naming the new company "Virgin Bank". The initial bid was not successful, and Northern Rock was then nationalised.

During 2011 the government again asked suitors to come forward with proposals for Northern Rock. On 17 November 2011, it was announced that Virgin Money were to buy Northern Rock for £747 million, with other potential payments of up to £280 million over the next few years. By July 2012, a further £73 million was paid as deferred consideration. WL Ross & Co increased its stake in Virgin Money, owning 44% of the combined business by putting £260 million into the deal. Both Abu Dhabi-based Stanhope Investments and Branson's Virgin Group invested £50 million in the Northern Rock deal. In 2014, Virgin Money repaid a further £154.5 million that it had received as part of the refinancing package.

There were to be no further job losses, except for those previously announced. Virgin has also pledged to keep the headquarters of the savings and mortgages business in Newcastle upon Tyne. On 9 January 2012, Richard Branson visited the Gosforth site and some branches of Northern Rock around Newcastle, including one with temporary Virgin Money branding.

On 22 June 2012, Virgin acquired the remainder of the Gosforth site from Northern Rock (Asset Management) plc, the "bad-bank" which had been split from Northern Rock prior to the sale of the bank to Virgin. On 23 July it was announced that Virgin would also be acquiring £465 million worth of mortgage assets from Northern Rock (Asset Management). On 12 October, Northern Rock plc was renamed Virgin Money plc and the Northern Rock brand was phased out.

In January 2013, Virgin agreed to buy £1 billion of assets from MBNA; these are the Virgin Credit Card assets which MBNA has serviced and managed in partnership with Virgin Money since 2002. The credit card book was integrated into Virgin Money's operations in 2014, and was expected to create 150 jobs at the Gosforth offices. The former Vice Chairman of MBNA Corporation, Lance Weaver, became Virgin Money's President of Virgin Money Cards. A further £363 million credit card asset portfolio was purchased from MBNA in 2014.

In October 2014, it was announced that Virgin Money Holdings (UK) plc would float shares on the London Stock Exchange in order to raise approximately £150 million which would go towards expanding and enabling it to continue to hire and maintain its existing base of top staff members. A successful offer led to a final payment of £50 million to the UK Government with respect to the company's IPO following the purchase of Northern Rock.

Church House Trust Limited was sold to Ocean Industries S.A. for £13 million on 30 November 2014. WL Ross & Co reduced its stake in the company to 23.3% in April 2015; Stanhope reduced its stake to 1%. WL Ross & Co sold its remaining stake in November 2016.

As of 2017, the business had 3.34 million customers.

=== Acquisition by CYBG plc ===
National Australia Bank acquired Clydesdale Bank in 1987 and Yorkshire Bank in 1995. Fred Goodwin, an accountant working for Touche Ross, worked on the acquisition of Clydesdale Bank. In 1995 Goodwin, with little direct banking experience, was appointed deputy CEO of the Clydesdale Bank. Clydesdale Bank and Yorkshire Bank began operating under a single banking licence in the UK in 2005: Yorkshire Bank became a division of Clydesdale Bank but retained its own name for trading purposes.

National Australia Bank confirmed in October 2014 that it planned to exit the UK, and was considering a number of options for Yorkshire Bank and Clydesdale Bank, including a possible stock market listing. Clydesdale Bank and Yorkshire Bank were demerged and placed in a separate holding company, CYBG plc (Clydesdale and Yorkshire Banking Group), which was listed on the London Stock Exchange and Australian Securities Exchange for conditional share trading on 3 February 2016 and unconditional trading from 8 February 2016.

On 7 May 2018, it was reported that CYBG plc had made an all-share offer of £1.7bn to acquire Virgin Money UK. Payment was to be in terms of a share offer where CYBG would give 1.2125 new shares for each Virgin Money share which was a 19% premium to the current share price and would see Virgin Money comprising 38% of the new combined group which would become the UK's sixth-largest bank with 6 million personal and small business customers, and total lending of £70bn.

On 18 June, it was announced that the takeover had been agreed. Arrangements were made for CYBG to license the Virgin Money brand for £12 million a year (later rising to £15 million a year) and to move all its retail customers to Virgin Money over the following three years. The acquisition of Virgin Money plc by CYBG was completed on 15 October 2018 and shares in the holding company Virgin Money Holdings (UK) plc were therefore delisted from the London Stock Exchange.

It was reported that the deal may result in 1,500 job losses. The retail banking operation would be fronted by the Virgin Money brand and the Clydesdale and Yorkshire Bank brands would disappear from the High street. Virgin Money CEO chief executive Jayne-Anne Gadhia will be retained as a senior advisor and will receive around £1.8m redundancy, £1m bonus, £5.1m in shares to add to her existing £8.9m shares. The all-share deal buyout gave her a paper profit of around £12.5m.

=== Rebrand to Virgin Money UK plc ===
In June 2019, CYBG plc announced its plans to consolidate its businesses under the Virgin Money brand. B and Yorkshire Bank, which existed as trading divisions of Clydesdale Bank plc, began to use the Virgin Money name in late 2019 and Clydesdale Bank used the new name from late 2020 to early 2021. In preparation for re-branding, the existing Virgin Money plc was merged into the existing Clydesdale Bank plc on 21 October 2019.

The group's name was changed from CYBG plc to Virgin Money UK plc on 31 October 2019.

CEO David Duffy's pay rose by 84% from £1.8m in 2018 to £3.4m in 2019. This was despite an investor revolt in which a third of shareholders opposed the payout, citing the fact that company had suffered its second consecutive annual loss, caused by a £385m charge for mis-sold payment protection insurance. Duffy's increase was largely due to a bonus of £1.3m linked to the 2015 demerger of Virgin Money's predecessor bank, CYBG, from National Australia Bank, as well as incentives from 2016.

As at 21 November 2023 significant shareholders of the business included Virgin Group (14%), Firetrail Investments Pty Limited (5%), BlackRock (5%), Perpetual Limited (4%), Investors Mutual Limited (4%) and Schroders (3%).

Although the Clydesdale brand has been phased out the name continues to appear on the Scottish banknotes issued by the bank.

=== Acquisition by Nationwide ===
On 7 March 2024, Nationwide Building Society, the UK's largest building society, announced that they had made an offer to buy the bank's parent company, Virgin Money UK plc, for £2.9 billion. Under the terms of the deal the resulting company would be rebranded under the Nationwide banner over the next 6 years with the Virgin Money brand eventually disappearing. Nationwide intends to remain as a building society and for the "medium-term" the Virgin Money business would remain its own legal entity with its own banking licence. Nationwide aims to not make any material changes to Virgin Money's 7,300 employees "in the near term".

Virgin Money's shareholders approved the deal on 22 May and it is expected to complete by the end of the year. On 31 May, the Competition and Markets Authority said that they would be investigating the proposed merger regarding the potential lessening of competition within the banking sector in the UK. On 19 July, the Competition and Markets Authority approved the transaction. The acquisition was completed on 1 October 2024 and shares in Virgin Money UK plc were delisted from the London Stock Exchange and the Australian Securities Exchange. Branson made £724 million from the deal, which includes £310 million for Nationwide's use of the Virgin Money brand for up to six years. The transfer of Virgin Money's business to Nationwide Building Society was completed on 2 April 2026, with the Virgin Money brand continuing as a trading name of Nationwide Building Society.

== Corporate affairs ==
=== Identity ===
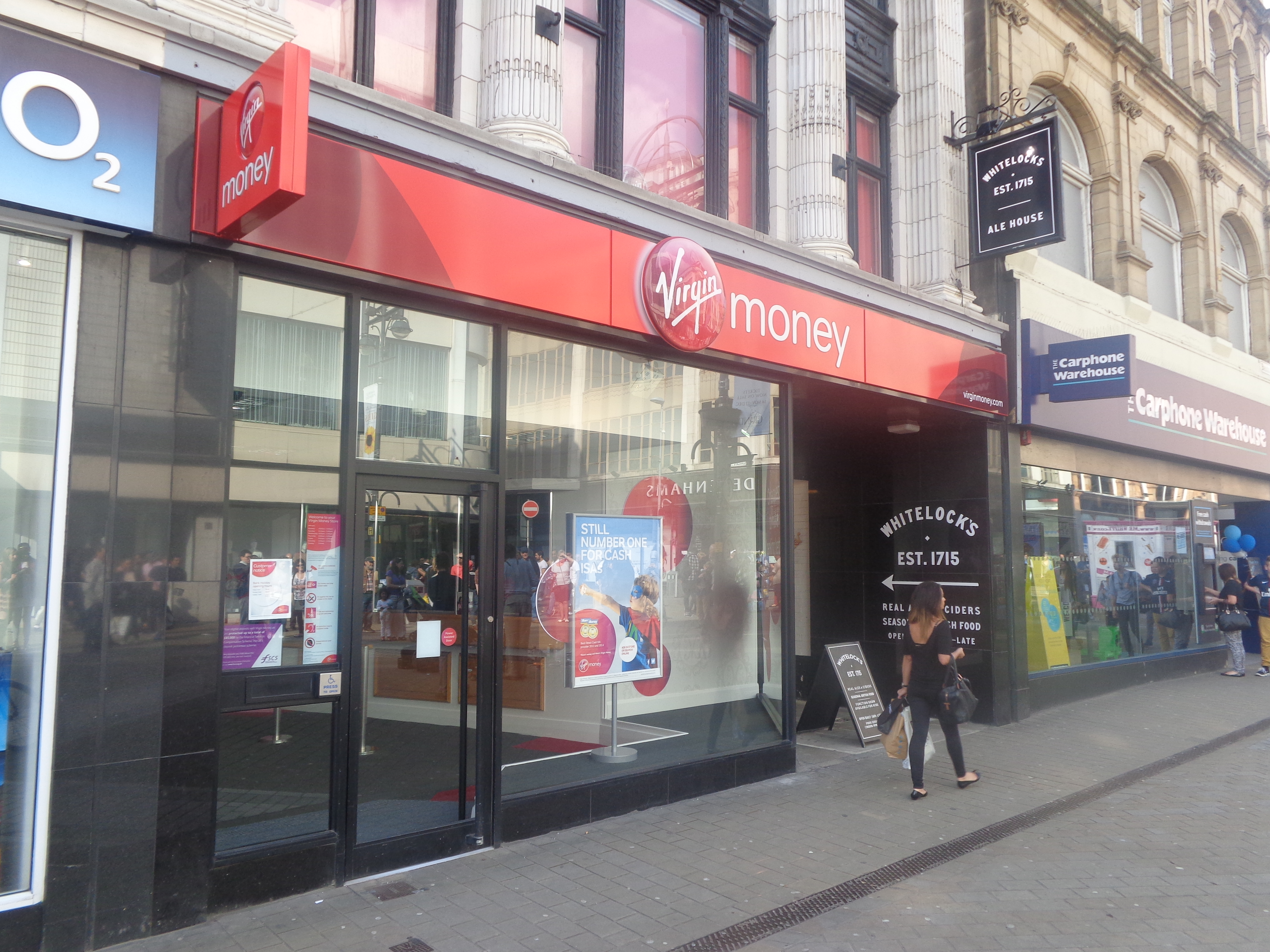
A Virgin Money store on Briggate in Leeds

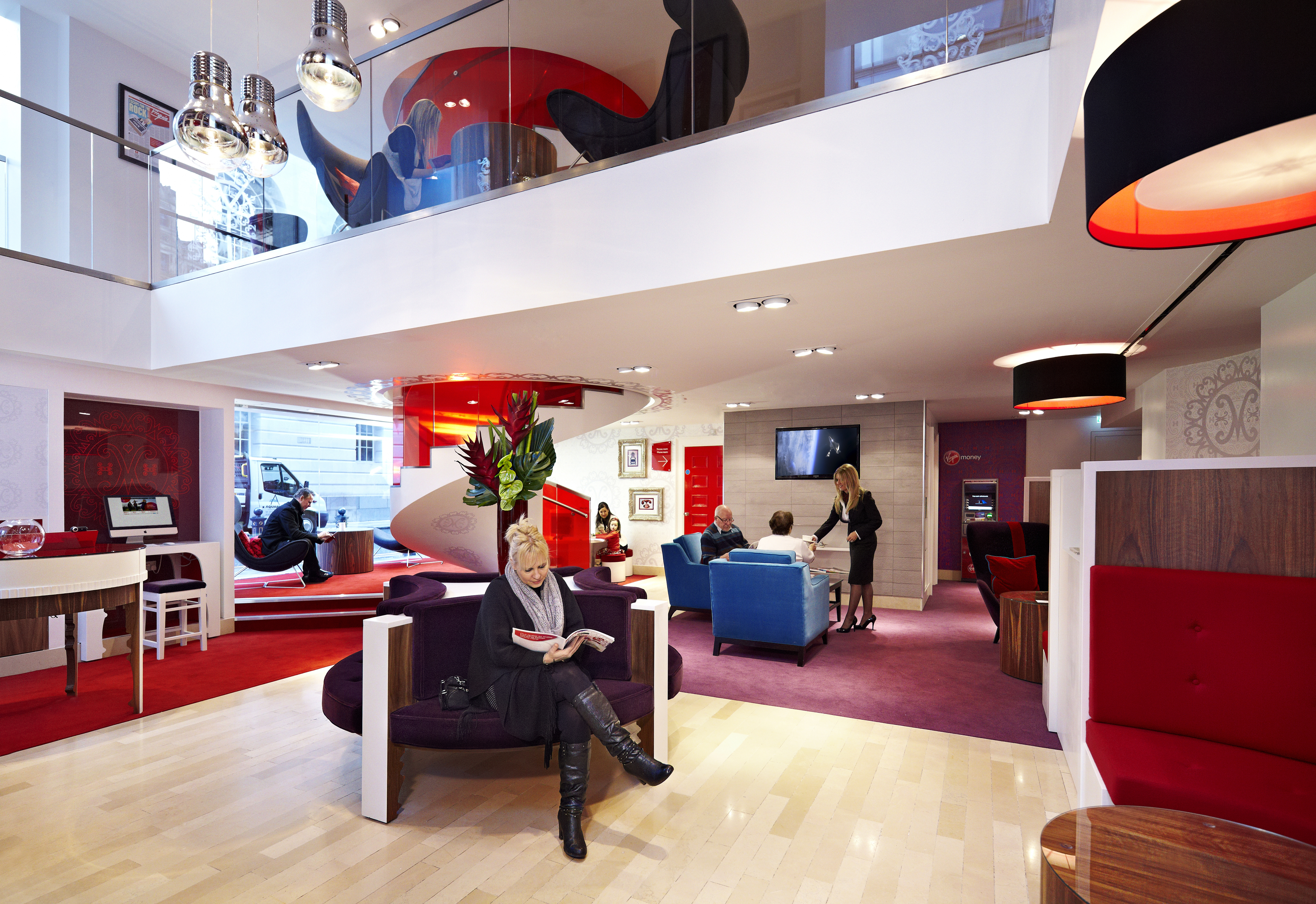
Interior of Virgin Money's Manchester lounge

Virgin Money's logo is focused around the main logo of Virgin Group, which is an underlined word 'Virgin' in a red circle. The most recent version of the logo was adopted in December 2019 and has the word "Virgin" in a red circle forming the letter O in the word "Money". The previous logo was adopted in January 2012 and was introduced to signify the purchase of Northern Rock, which used a magenta logo. Virgin Money's January 2012 television advert showcasing the launch of banking products showcased a number of Virgin companies and was directed by Duncan Jones and worked on by Beattie McGuinness Bungay. Virgin Money's older logo was the word 'Virgin' in a red rounded skew rectangle, similar in shape to a credit card, followed by the word 'Money'. A previous logo had the word 'Virgin' in a large circle and three smaller circles above the word 'Money'. Virgin Direct's logo had been a more simplistic rendering of the company name, in white on top of a red rectangle with a semicircle attached on the left side.

=== Offices ===
Virgin Money's headquarters are the former Northern Rock offices, renamed as Jubilee House, in Gosforth, Newcastle upon Tyne. The site is next to the Regent Centre business park and comprises two black and grey buildings built in the 1990s and some additional sandstone and glass buildings built in the early 2000s.

Virgin Money also have offices in Eagle Place, Piccadilly, London, at 28 St Andrew Square, Edinburgh, Gorstacks House in Chester and Discovery House in Norwich, which had been Virgin Money's head office prior to becoming a bank.

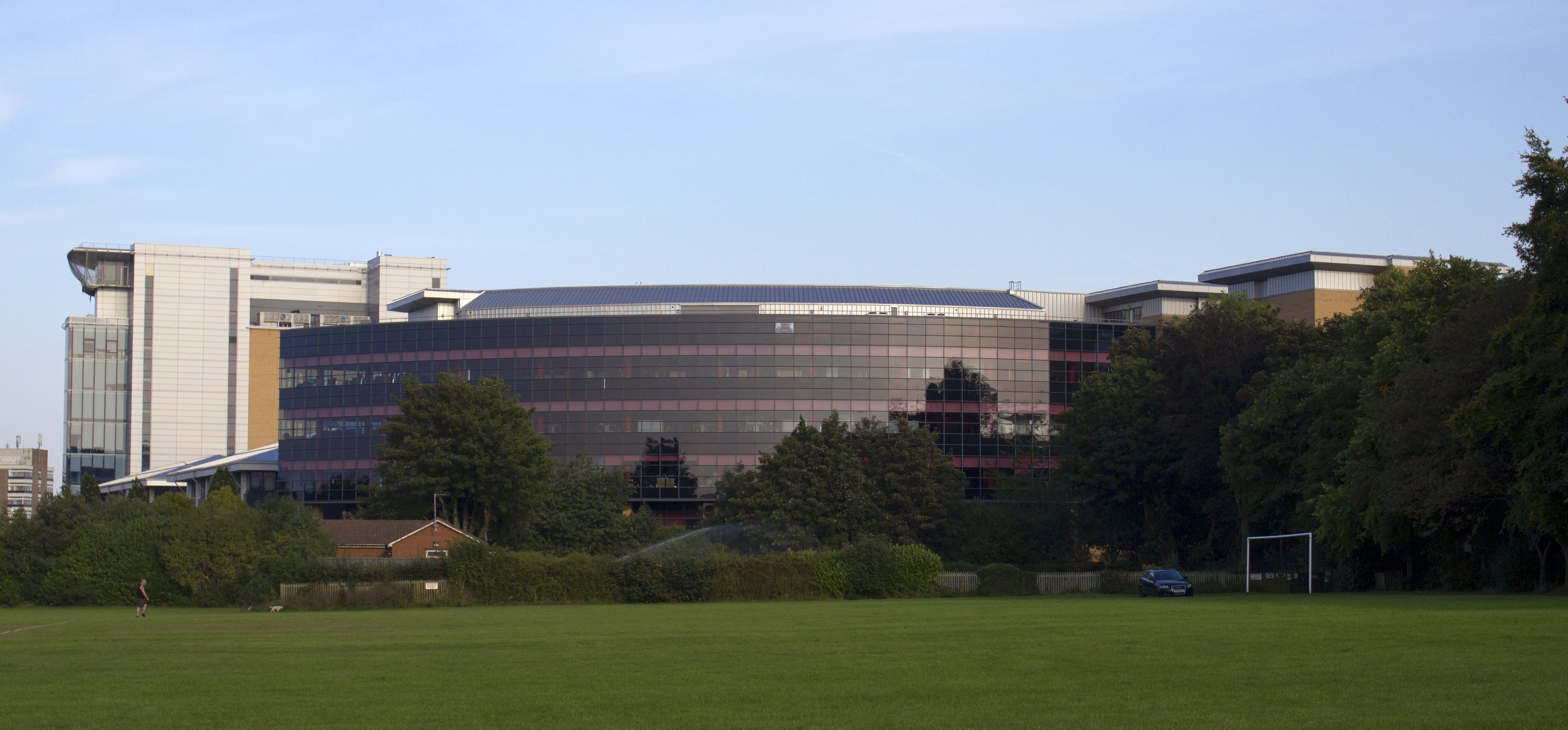
Headquarters of Virgin Money in Newcastle upon Tyne

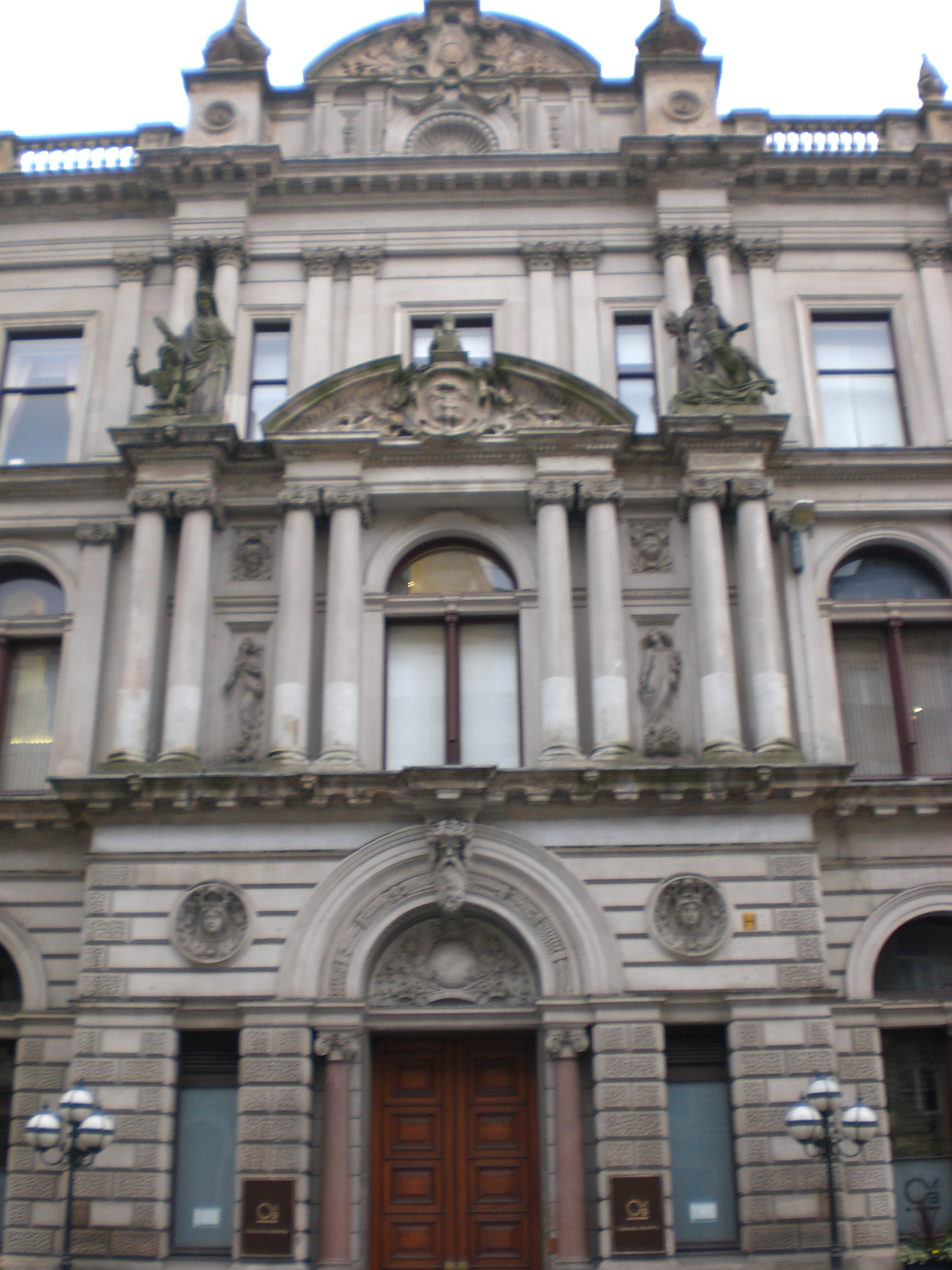
Offices at St Vincent Place, Glasgow

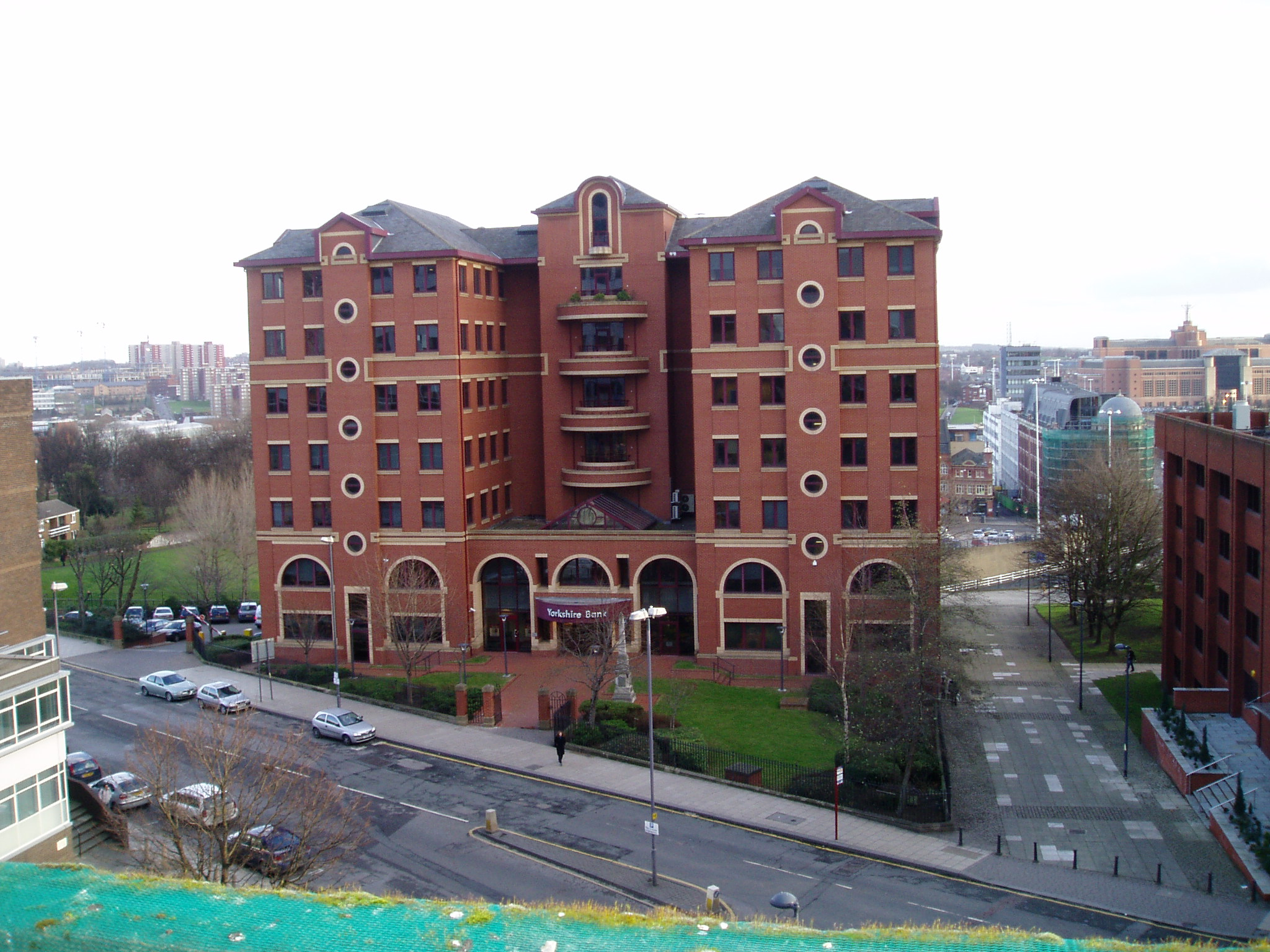
Offices on Wade Lane, Leeds

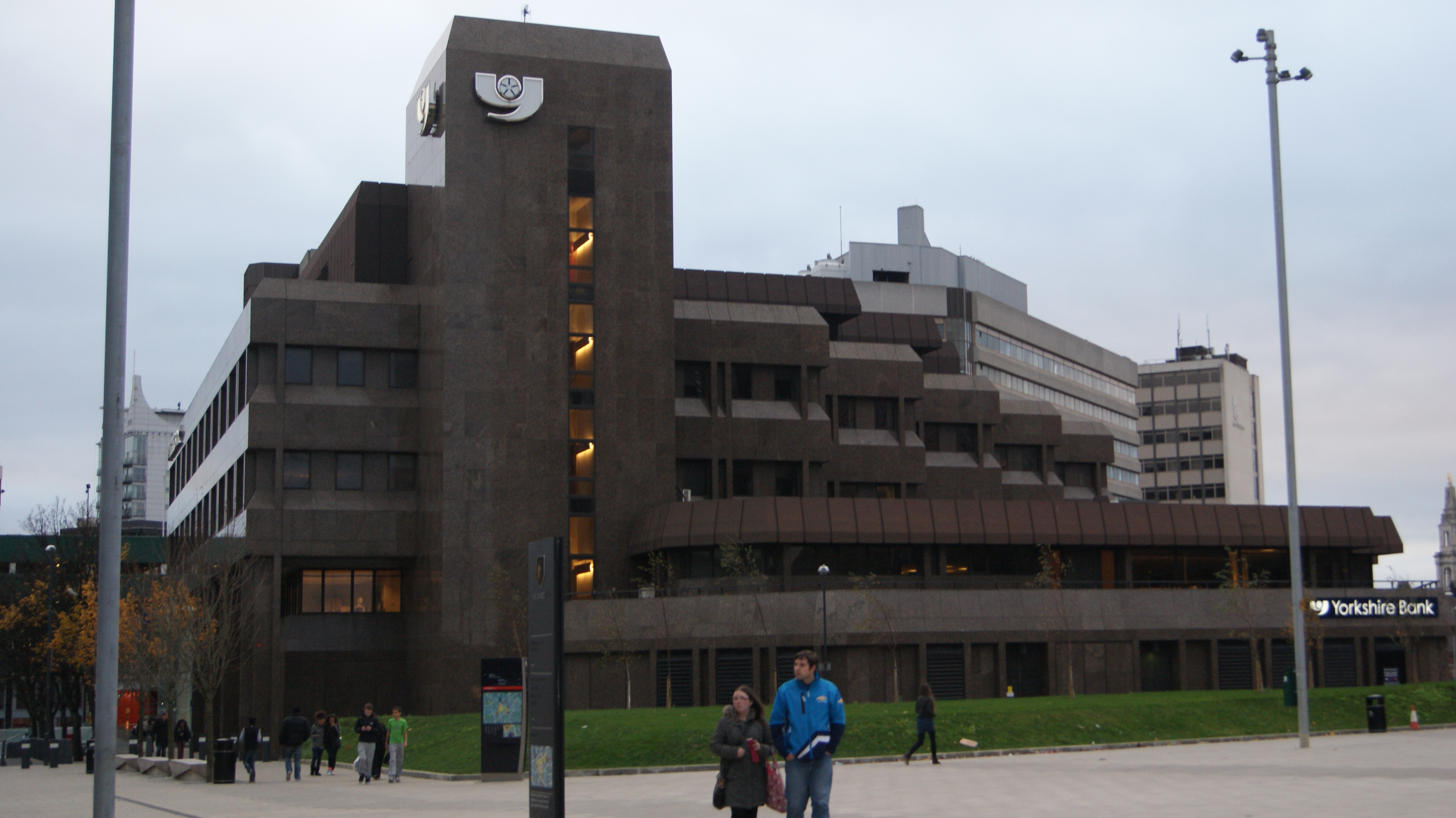
Offices on Merrion Way, Leeds

== Services ==
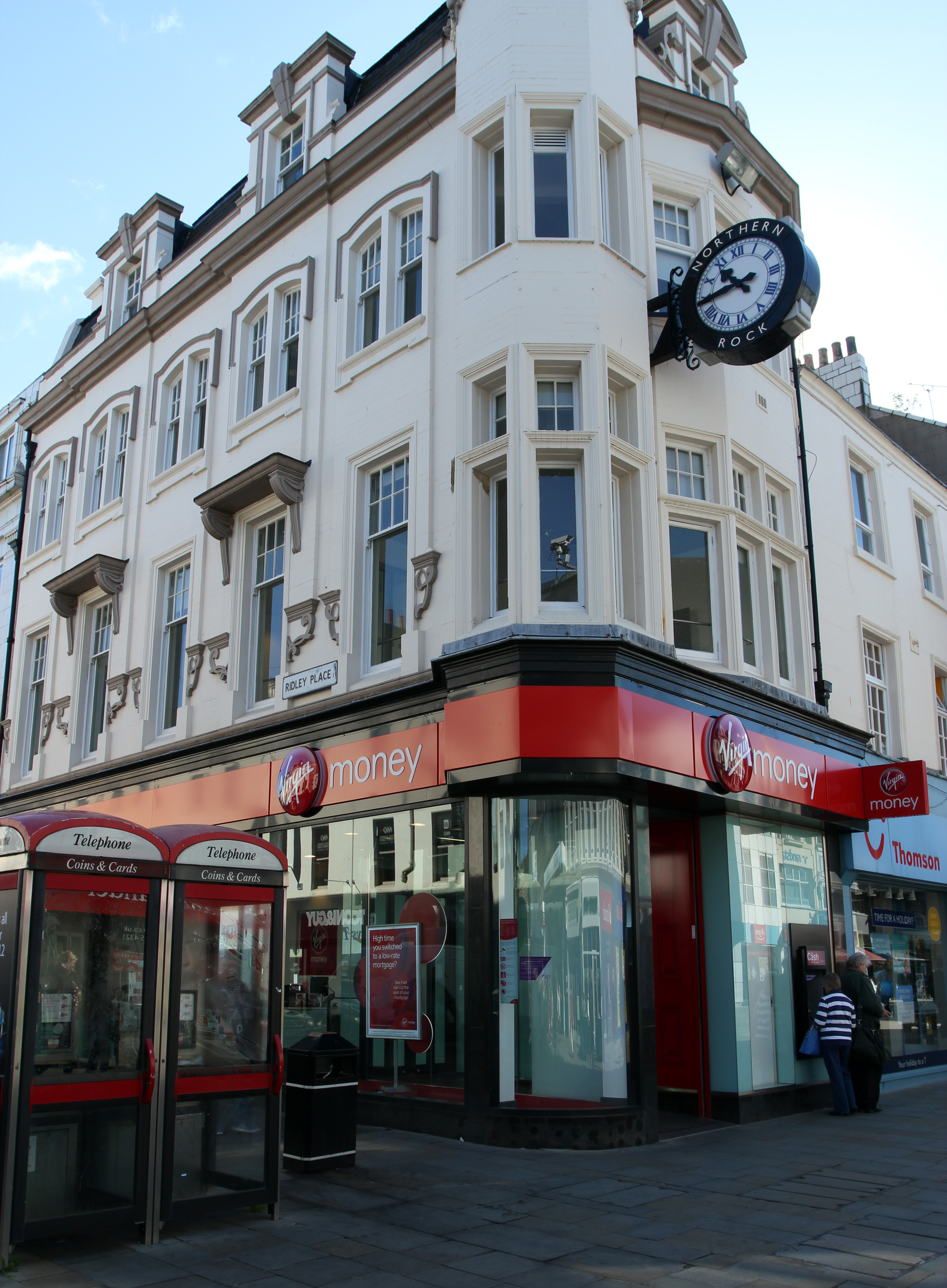
The Virgin Money Northumberland Street store, Newcastle upon Tyne. This store was formerly a Northern Rock branch and the branded clock, which retains its Northern Rock lettering, became a well-known symbol of the former bank's collapse.

Virgin Money offers a range of savings and investment products, mortgages, credit cards, insurance and pensions. The merger with Northern Rock widened Virgin Money's range from a previous focus on credit cards and insurance products, and the first savings accounts to be offered under the Virgin brand were issued in January 2012. These were gradually supplemented by other additional banking products under its own brand name. The bank launched its own range of basic current accounts in July 2014, initially only in Scotland and Northern Ireland. This was expanded to the rest of the UK in 2015.

In November 2011, the bank opened the first of its concept lounges in Norwich, followed by Edinburgh, Manchester, London and Glasgow with plans to open more. Virgin renamed Northern Rock's 75 branches as stores, and the first to receive a temporary Virgin makeover opened on 9 January 2012. Richard Branson has also indicated in interviews that he would like to open branches at railway stations; Virgin Rail Group operated a number of railway stations at the time. The full rebranding process, which also included the combining of the Northern Rock website into the existing Virgin Money website, was completed by October.

Virgin Money launched a fully functional current account in December 2019. The account uses technology previously used by the "B" account offered by Clydesdale Bank. All existing "B" accounts were converted to Virgin Money current accounts as part of this process.

The bank was authorised by the Prudential Regulation Authority and regulated by both the Financial Conduct Authority and the Prudential Regulation Authority.

=== Virgin Money Giving ===
Virgin Money Giving was a not-for-profit fundraising website launched in October 2009. In 2008 Virgin Money signed a deal to be the official sponsor of the London Marathon from 2010. This sponsorship led to the creation of Virgin Money Giving, with the aim "to help all fund-raisers raise more money for good causes". The website was closed, and the London Marathon sponsorship ended, in 2021.

=== Virgin Money Foundation ===
The Virgin Money Foundation is the charitable arm of the bank and was founded in 2015 to replace the Northern Rock Foundation. The bank has initially pledged £4 million to the charity over 4 years, and the UK Government has committed to match that pledge.

== Sponsorship ==
Virgin Money led the sponsorship of the London Marathon from 2010 to 2021. Virgin Money also lent its name to the yacht that Sir Richard Branson used to attempt to break the Transatlantic sailing record. Since 2011 Virgin Money has sponsored events at the Edinburgh Festival Fringe.

Virgin Money were the shirt sponsor of Newcastle United F.C. for the 2012-13 season, a club that had a sponsorship deal with Northern Rock since 2003. Newcastle United's shirts also displayed the Virgin Money logo for the remainder of the 2011–12 season, fulfilling Northern Rock's deal at the time of being bought by Virgin. To coincide with the launch of Virgin Money's rebranded stores, Richard Branson appeared in Newcastle, wearing a Newcastle United shirt, with a number of Newcastle United's footballers. The deal between Virgin Money and Newcastle United had also covered the 2013-14 season, but the club decided to end the deal a year early.

Virgin Money are the former title sponsor of the Cyclone, the UK's biggest cycling festival, which had previously also been sponsored by Northern Rock. The first Virgin Money Cyclone was held in Summer 2012.

== See also ==
- List of banks in the United Kingdom
- Virgin Money (brand)
