= J. Lumsden and Son =

J. Lumsden and Son is a Scottish engraving and publishing firm founded in 1783 by James Lumsden, most known for its short runs of high quality printings of children's books. The firm also made bookbinders' finishing tools.

The founder James Lumsden retired in 1810 and the business passed to his son, also James Lumsden (1778-1856), who adapted its speciality to stationery. When he retired in 1852, the company was taken over by his son James Lumsden (1808-1879), who had attended the University of Glasgow until 1821, when he entered the family business, becoming a partner in 1834. The younger Lumsden was knighted in 1868, becoming Sir James Lumsden of Arden. On Sir James's retirement in 1876 his son, also James Lumsden (1851-1911), took an interest in the firm.

The majority of books produced by them were sold to affluent families in Scotland and Northern England, with their average book price of sixpence putting them beyond affordability for the average family.

The firm was one of the earliest to engage in the practice of releasing the same book under multiple-covers to increase sales; this practice has now meant that books published by Lumsden are highly collectible.

Partial list of books published by Lumsden:

- 1812 - Peter Williamson, The life and curious adventures of Peter Williamson
- 1812 - anon, Nurse Dandlem
- 1815 - Jonathan Swift, The adventures of Captain Gulliver in a voyage to Lilliput
- 1816 - anon, Fun Upon Fun
- 1818 - Marie Le Prince de Beaumont, Beauty and the beast
- 1843 - The New Testament
- 1845 - Joseph Train, An Historical and Statistical Account of the Isle of Man

== Bibliography ==
- Roscoe, S., and Brimmell, R. A., James Lumsden and Son of Glasgow. Their Juvenile Books and Chapbooks, Private Libraries Association, 1981
