= Tandem Money =

Challenger bank offering credit card and savings account

Tandem Money Limited
- Trade name: Tandem
- Industry: Financial services
- Founded: 2014; 12 years ago
- Headquarters: Blackpool, England, UK
- Products: Banking
- Website: www.tandem.co.uk

Tandem is one of the UK's original challenger banks. Tandem is a digital bank with a mobile app, and no branches.

The acquisition of Harrods Bank in 2017 allowed the company to provide services using the former's banking licence. Tandem Bank Limited is authorised by the Prudential Regulation Authority and regulated by the Financial Conduct Authority.

Tandem has offices across the UK in Blackpool, Cardiff, Durham and London, employing over 500 people.

== History ==
The company was founded by Ricky Knox, Matt Cooper and Michael Kent in 2014.

In December 2016, Tandem announced that it had secured a £35 million investment from The Sanpower Group, the Chinese company that also owned the department store House of Fraser; however, £29 million of this investment was later revoked by Sanpower over concerns that the Chinese Government would object to the investment following increased restrictions on outbound investment in China. This resulted in a delay in the launch of Tandem's savings products, which, at the time of the revocation, was expected imminently and, more importantly, meant that Tandem volunteered the return of their banking licence but retained all other permissions.

In April 2018, Tandem launched fixed-term savings accounts, offering one-, two- and three-year terms through its app.

=== Acquisitions ===
In August 2017, it was announced that Tandem would fully acquire Harrods Bank, founded in 1893, in a deal that would bring a near-£200m loan book, over £300m of deposits and nearly £80 million of capital. Prior to its sale to Tandem Money, Harrods Bank catered for high-net-worth (HNW) individuals and operated from the Harrods store in Knightsbridge, London. It offered a variety of personal and business current and savings accounts, mortgages, foreign currency and gold bullion trading services. On 7 August 2017, Tandem Money Limited announced a deal to acquire 100% of Harrods Bank Limited shares. The purchase deal closed successfully on 11 January 2018.

In March 2018, Tandem agreed to acquire Pariti Technologies Limited, developers of the Pariti money management application.

In August 2020 Tandem acquired green home improvement loan specialists Allium Lending Group.

It was announced on 8 February 2021 that Tandem had agreed to purchase the mortgage book from private bank Bank and Clients, consisting of 300 B&C customers for an undisclosed amount.

In January 2022 Tandem Bank acquired consumer lender Oplo, creating a combined business with £1.2 billion of total assets.

In April 2023, it was announced that Tandem had acquired money-sharing app Loop Money. At the time of the purchase, one of Loop's founders – Paul Pester – was also chairman at Tandem.

== Features ==
Tandem Bank offers customers savings, mortgages, personal and secured loans, green home improvement loans and motor finance.

In November 2022, the bank launched its new Tandem Marketplace, providing information and resources to help promote greener living.

== See also ==
- Financial technology
- List of banks in the United Kingdom
