= RBC BlueBay Asset Management =

Asset management of the Royal Bank of Canada

- Type: Subsidiary
- Headquarters: London, UK
- Products: Specialist fixed income and equities.
- AUM: US$468 billion (June 2024) global AUM
- Website: www.rbcbluebay.com

RBC BlueBay Asset Management (“RBC BlueBay”) represents the asset management division of Royal Bank of Canada (“RBC”) outside North America. RBC is among the world’s largest banks by market capitalization.

RBC BlueBay is an active investment manager specialising in fixed income (BlueBay) and equities strategies.

== History ==
BlueBay Asset Management was founded in 2001. The company was initially established to capitalise on strong growth trends in the European corporate and global emerging debt markets.

RBC Global Asset Management UK, originally known as Royal Trust Global Investment Group, was founded in 1996.

Royal Bank of Canada agreed to acquire the company in October 2010, in a deal valued at £963 million ($1.54 billion), completed on 17 December 2010.

In 2020, RBC Global Asset Management UK and BlueBay Asset Management made the strategic decision to merge legal entities. The transition to a single business entity was formally completed in early 2023.

In 2022, RBC Global Asset Management UK and BlueBay Asset Management rebranded as RBC BlueBay Asset Management (“RBC BlueBay”).

== Operations ==
RBC BlueBay has investment teams in the UK, US, and Hong Kong, and clients across Europe, Asia and the Middle East through 10 regional offices.
