= Scottish Financial Enterprise =

Scottish Financial Enterprise is the representative body for Scotland's financial services industry. It is a company limited by guarantee based in Edinburgh. Member companies range in size from global organisations headquartered in Scotland to small, locally based support companies drawn from all areas of financial services.
