= SME finance =

Funding of small and medium-sized enterprises

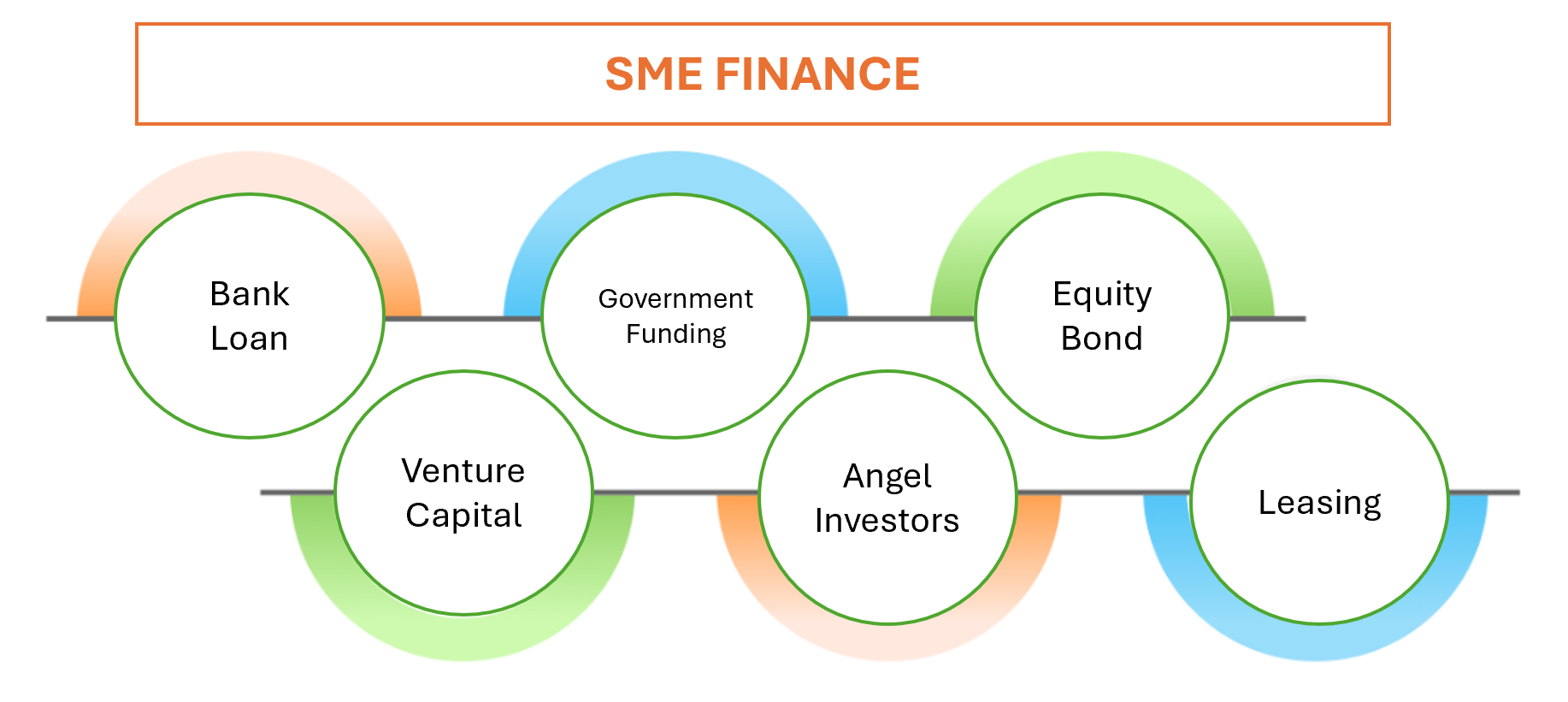
Financing options for SMEs

SME finance is the funding of small and medium-sized enterprises, and represents a major function of the general business finance market in which capital for different types of firms is supplied, acquired, and costed or priced. Capital is supplied through the business finance market in the form of bank loans and overdrafts; leasing and hire-purchase arrangements; equity/corporate bond issues; venture capital or private equity; asset-based finance such as factoring and invoice discounting, and government funding in the form of grants or loans.

== Importance ==
The economic and banking importance of the small and medium enterprise (SME) sector is well recognized in academic and policy literature. It is also acknowledged that these actors in the economy may be under-served, especially in terms of finance. This has led to significant debate on the best methods to serve this sector.

Although there have been numerous schemes and programmes in different economic environments, there are a number of distinctive recurring approaches to SME finance. One such approach is collateral-based lending, which encompasses a combination of asset-based lending, contribution-based finance, invoice discounting, and factoring-based finance. This approach relies on the collateral provided by reliable debtors or contractual agreements, serving as a cornerstone for SME financing.

Another method is information-based lending, which incorporates financial statement lending, credit scoring mechanisms, and relationship-based lending practices. This method involves a comprehensive evaluation of a borrower's financial position, ensuring informed and balanced allocation of financial resources.

Viability-based financing, another approach to SME finance, is closely associated with the venture capital sphere. This mechanism involves assessing the viability and growth potential of SMEs, making it particularly relevant for emerging businesses with promising growth prospects.

== Gap ==
A substantial portion of the SME sector may not have the security required for conventional collateral based bank lending, nor high enough returns to attract formal venture capitalists and other risk investors. In addition, markets may be characterized by deficient information (limiting the effectiveness of financial statement-based lending and credit scoring). This has led to claims of an "SME finance gap" or Nano gap– particularly in emerging economies. At a workshop hosted by The Network for Governance, Entrepreneurship & Development (GE&D) in Geneva in July 2008, SMEs that fall into this category have been defined as Small Growing Businesses (SGBs).

There have been at least two distinctive approaches to try to overcome the so-called SME finance gap.

The first has been to broaden the collateral based approach by encouraging bank lenders to finance SMEs with insufficient collateral. This might be done through an external party providing the collateral or guarantees required. Unfortunately, such schemes are counter to basic free market principles, and they tend to be unsustainable. This sector is increasingly called the Meso-finance sector.

However, there are no evidence of any significant structural barriers to the supply of bank or private equity finance to suitable SME applicants on mutually satisfactory terms and conditions in Britain. The main obstacles to funding here appear to be on the demand rather than the supply side of the business finance market. This is mainly in the form of:

- Lack of satisfactory business plans, accounting and other information;
- Inadequate assets for use as security; and,
- Insufficiently high levels of profitability, gearing, liquidity, stability, and other business-financial performance criteria on the part of funding applicants.

Thus, the second approach has been to broaden the viability based approach. Since the viability based approach is concerned with the business itself, the aim has been to provide better general business development assistance to reduce risk and increase returns. This often entails a detailed review and assistance with the business plan.

A common aim or feature of the viability based approach is the provision of appropriate finance that is tailored to the cash flows of the SME.

Although the returns generated by this approach in less developed countries may not be attractive to venture capitalists, they can be significantly better than conventional collateral based lending – whilst at the same time being less risky than the typical venture capitalist business. Thus, a new, distinct asset class, offering a new avenue for diversification, is available to investors. With higher profitability than traditional SME finance and lower risk than traditional venture capital, this sector has been named the "growth finance sector".

In the past, a significant obstacle to applying this approach in less developed countries has been getting the information required to assess viability, plus the costs of transferring and providing business development assistance. However, in the last several years, improved information and communications technology have made the process easier and cheaper. As technology and information sharing continue to improve, the approach could become significantly more cost-effective and attractive to established financiers with viability based approaches, and to consultants providing business development assistance to SMEs in other, more mainstream areas.

Some investors have promoted this approach as a means of achieving wider social benefits, while others have been interested in developing it largely in order to generate better financial-economic returns for shareholders, investors, employees, and clients.

A new organisation, Aspen Network for Development Entrepreneurs (ANDE), has been created to bring the growth finance stakeholders together, with the view to evolve into an association serving the sector, similar to what venture capital or microfinance associations do. They have declared their target audience to be Small Growing Businesses.

In 2008, a group of financial service providers and other stakeholders came together to form the Finance Alliance for Sustainable Trade (FAST). FAST is an association of financial service providers explicitly committed to improving access to finance for sustainable SMEs—defined as SMEs that are compliant with one or more of a host of growing sustainability standards (such as organics, fair trade, forest stewardship council etc.).

== The management of business lending ==
The effective management of lending to SMEs can contribute significantly to the overall growth and profitability of banks. There has been considerable research and analysis into the methods by which banks assess and monitor business loans, manage business financing risks, and price their products – and how these methods might be further developed and improved.

There has been particularly intensive scrutiny of the kinds of business financial information that banks use in making lending decisions, and how reliable that information actually is.

Banks have traditionally relied on a combination of documentary sources of information, interviews and visits, and the personal knowledge and expertise of managers in assessing and monitoring business loans. However, when assessing comparatively small and straightforward business credit applications, banks may largely rely on standardized credit scoring techniques (quantifying such things as the characteristics, assets, and cash flows of businesses/owners). Using such techniques – and also centralizing or rationalizing business-banking operations generally – can significantly reduce processing costs. Standardized computer-based assessment may also be more accurate and fairer than reliance on the personal judgments of local bank managers. As a result, banks may now be able to offer more loans, faster and in larger amounts, and reduce previously high security requirements.

However, business lending as a whole is substantially more diverse and complex than personal and residential mortgage lending. This, coupled with the large size and inherently risky nature of many business loans, tend to limit the scope and desirability of computerized credit scoring in assessment and monitoring.

Scottish Government make available funding for small and medium sized enterprises in order to help them reduce resource usage (in particular energy) and lessen carbon impacts. The Scottish Government SME Loan Fund is unsecured and interest free (loans for renewable technologies are charged at 5% due to the Renewable Heat Incentive.
