= Clydesdale Bank =

UK-based bank and financial services company

Clydesdale Bank Ltd.

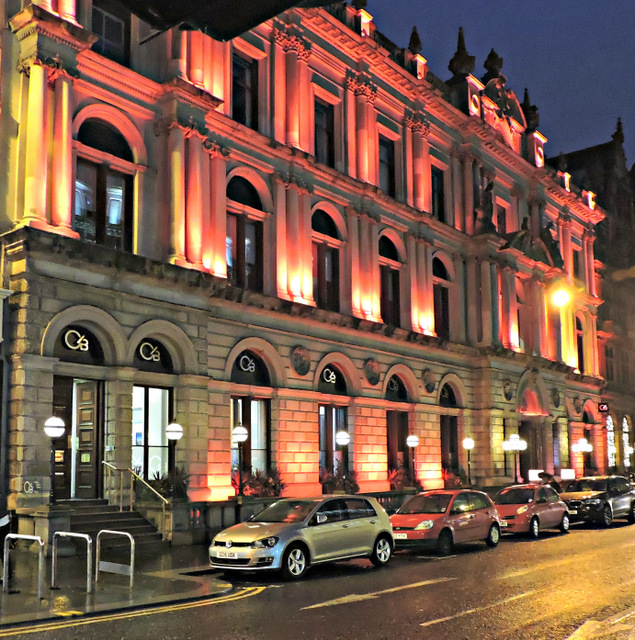
- The former historic headquarters of Clydesdale Bank on St Vincent Place, Glasgow
- Formerly: Clydesdale Banking Company; Clydesdale Bank plc
- Type: Trading name
- Industry: Banking, Financial services
- Founded: 2 March 1838; May 1838 (official opening)
- Founder: James Lumsden
- Headquarters: Glasgow, Scotland, UK
- Services: Retail banking
- Parent: Nationwide Building Society

Clydesdale is a Scottish financial services brand dating back to 1838. Until 2026, Clydesdale Bank plc was a major retail and commercial bank based in Glasgow. It traded using the Virgin Money brand name from 2019 onwards. Clydesdale Bank was acquired by Nationwide Building Society in October 2024 and most of its business was transferred to Nationwide on 2 April 2026 with the Clydesdale brand continuing to be used by Nationwide for some mortgage products.

With its international growth in commercial and industrial clients, including Sir Robert McAlpine & Sons, and their extensive credit requirements it sought investment by a larger consortium. Consequently it was purchased by Midland Bank, the largest bank in the world at this stage, in 1920. Much later the Clydesdale became part of the National Australia Bank Group (NAB), between 1987 and 2016. Clydesdale Bank was divested from National Australia Bank in early 2016, with its new holding company, CYBG plc, trading on the London and Sydney stock exchanges. In June 2018, it was announced that CYBG would acquire Virgin Money for £1.7 billion in an all-stock deal, and that the Clydesdale and Yorkshire Bank public brands would be phased out in favour of retaining Virgin's brand, including the renaming of CYBG plc to Virgin Money UK plc. In October 2024 the bank was acquired by Nationwide Building Society. Most of the bank's business was subsequently legally transferred to Nationwide in April 2026.

As with two other banks of Scottish origin, namely the Bank of Scotland and the Royal Bank of Scotland, Clydesdale Bank retains the right to issue its own Scottish banknotes.

== History ==
=== Establishment ===
In March 1838, an advertisement appeared for a new joint stock banking company in Glasgow, the Clydesdale Banking Company. It was to be "chiefly a local bank – having few branches – but correspondents everywhere" though it was conceded that a branch in Edinburgh would be necessary. The Bank duly opened for business in both cities in May 1838. Checkland described the Bank as the creation of "a group of Glasgow businessmen of middling order, liberal radicals…who were active in the government and charities of the city."

The driving figure behind the formation of the bank was James Lumsden, a stationer by business, a councillor, police commissioner and, later, Lord Provost of Glasgow. Another member of the founding committee, Henry Brock, became the Bank's first manager. Brock came of a merchant family, was an accountant and one of the founders of the Glasgow Savings Bank. Despite the declaration in the advertisement, in the year after formation the Bank opened three Glasgow branches as well as its first country branches in Campbeltown and Falkirk; a further seven had been opened by 1844. These were supplemented by the acquisition of the Greenock Union Bank; formed in 1840, it had four branches in the Glasgow hinterland.

=== Expansion ===
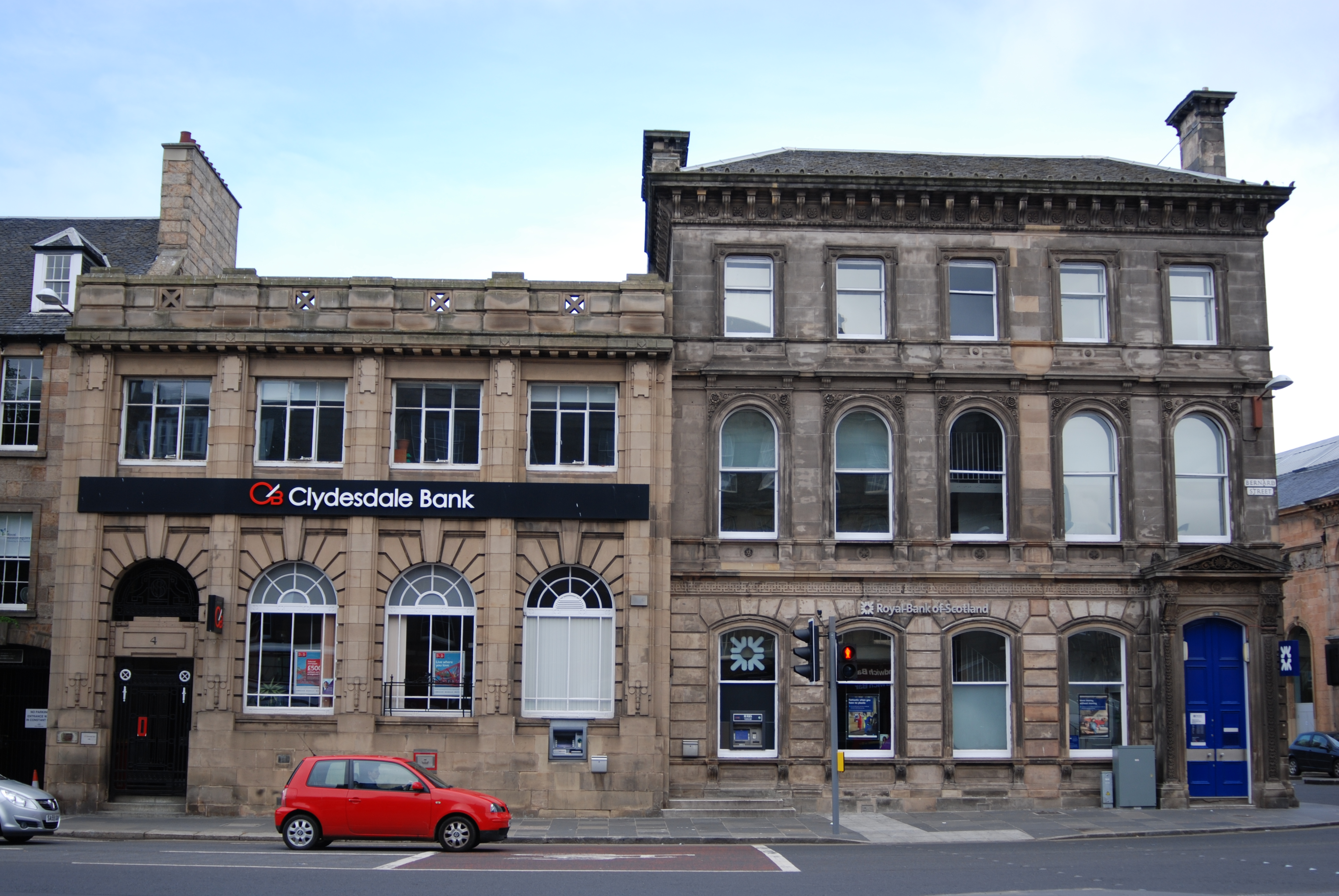
A former branch of Clydesdale Bank in Leith

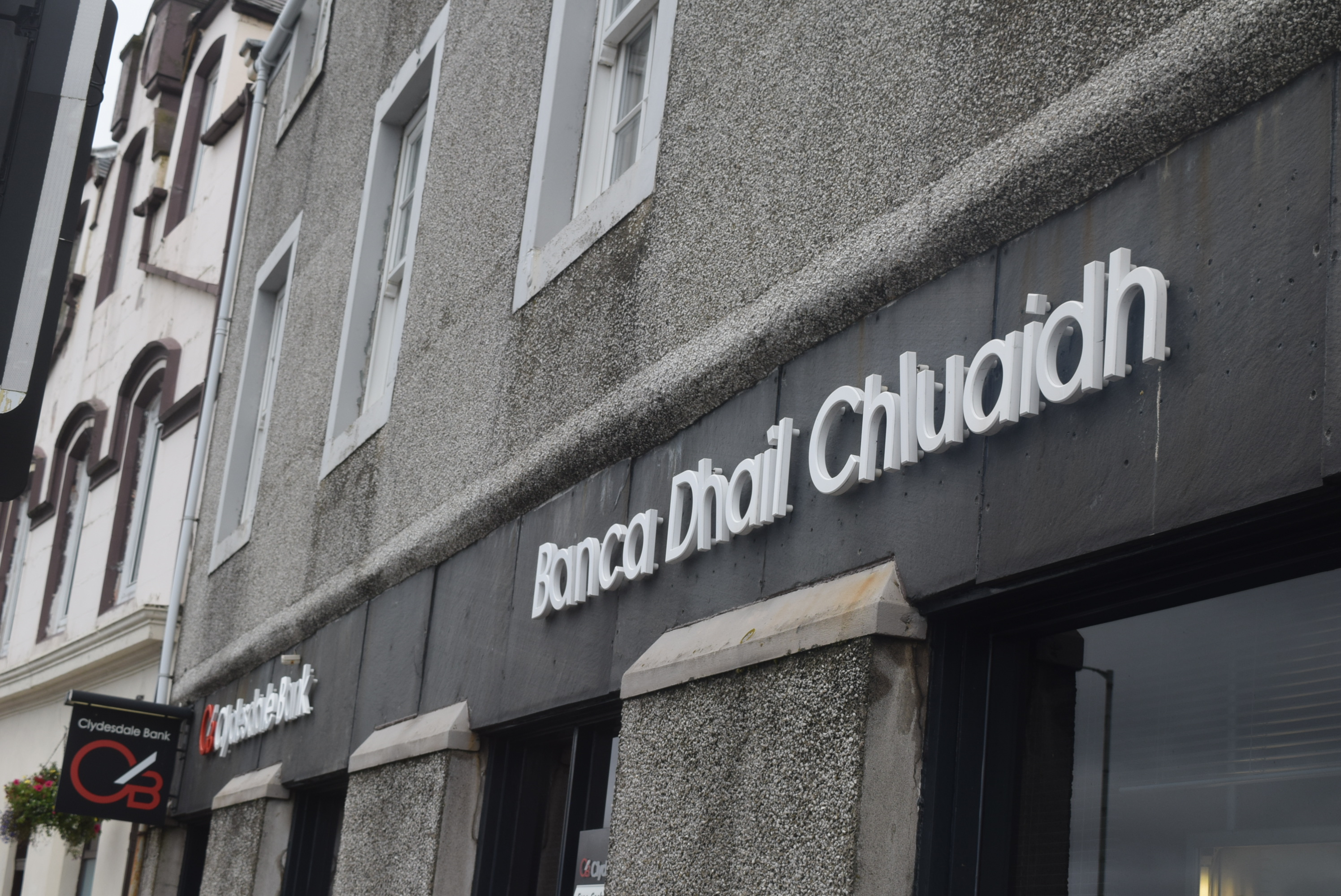
The Clydesdale Bank/Banca Dhail Chluaidh Stornoway branch bearing a bilingual sign in English and Gaelic

Following the purchase of the Greenock Union, there was little change in the structure of the Bank and there were still only 13 branches in 1857. In that year, Clydesdale became the first Scottish bank to produce a printed balance sheet, and it showed assets of £2.7 million and net profits of £70,000. The public disclosure of its strength stood it in good stead, for only months later the Western Bank of Scotland closed its doors, followed the next day by the first closure of the City of Glasgow Bank. Clydesdale gained not only customers but 13 branches from the Western. A few months later came the acquisition of the Edinburgh and Glasgow Bank, which had been weakened by the same economic disturbances. The Edinburgh & Leith Bank, as it was originally, had been formed in 1838 "for the benefit of the 'industrious middle classes'" and it had bought the Dumfries-based Southern Bank of Scotland in 1842 and the Glasgow Joint Stock Bank in 1844, the latter leading to the change of name to Edinburgh & Glasgow Bank. Poor lending in the 1845–47 period, particularly to Australia, dogged the Bank for the next ten years and it was eventually taken over by the Clydesdale for a nil consideration; Clydesdale retained 19 of its 27 offices. Five years later, in 1863, Clydesdale acquired the more successful Eastern Bank of Scotland, like Clydesdale, also founded in 1838. Based in Dundee it was to have two separate offices and boards, one in Dundee, the other Edinburgh. Before opening for business it acquired the Dundee Commercial Bank to serve as its Dundee office. Difficulties with the two boards working together led to the Edinburgh bank being wound up and the Eastern became an essentially Dundee bank; its acquisition gave Clydesdale its first interests north of the River Tay.

Much of the growth in the Bank's network had come from acquisitions and the management remained cautious regarding direct branch expansion. However, in 1865, a committee was formed to look at prospects and 16 branches were opened in two years. In 1874 the Clydesdale went south of the border and opened three branches in Cumberland but this was seen as following existing trade rather than making a specific attempt to enter the English market. Indeed, Clydesdale was one of the last Scottish banks to acquire a London office (1877). In 1878, the City of Glasgow Bank failed for the second time, leading again to an increase in Clydesdale's deposits and the acquisition of nine of the Glasgow branches. The scale of the collapse led to further debate on the desirability of limited liability and, following legislation in 1879 (allowing fixed uncalled liability on shares), Clydesdale Bank registered as a limited liability company in 1882.

Reid described the period 1890–1914 as "the tranquil years", but that did not preclude steady expansion of the branch network – from 92 to 153. That was to mark the end of Clydesdale's independent existence.

=== The Midland Era ===
In 1917 the bank was approached by London City and Midland (later Midland Bank) and, although initially resisted, Clydesdale Bank was sold in 1920. However, it continued to operate independently and was always referred to as an affiliate, not a subsidiary. The Glasgow banks suffered more than others in the depressed economy of the inter-war period and from being the largest lender in Scotland in 1920, it fell to fifth place by 1939. Despite this, the Bank continued to open branches, particularly in areas enjoying export growth, and the network increased from 158 in 1919 to 205 in 1939.

Midland had also acquired the North of Scotland Bank in 1923 but the Aberdeen management had fiercely resisted any attempt to merge with Clydesdale. However, the changed competitive market after the Second World War meant that the two banks could not remain separate and in 1950 they were amalgamated to become the Clydesdale and North of Scotland Bank (soon shortened to Clydesdale Bank). Clydesdale had 189 branches and the North of Scotland 161, covering 221 towns between them. Of the eight Scottish banks, Clydesdale had been the third-largest by deposits, the North being the smallest. The merged bank became Scotland's largest in terms of deposits, advances and branches. However, by 1969, mergers elsewhere had reduced the number of Scottish banks to three with Clydesdale now being the smallest. Midland needed to rationalise the enlarged Clydesdale but faced resistance. Midland also needed additional capital and its solution to both challenges was to sell Clydesdale (along with Midland's Irish subsidiaries) to National Australia Bank in 1987.

=== National Australia Bank Group ===
Logo of Clydesdale Bank used between 1989 and 2019

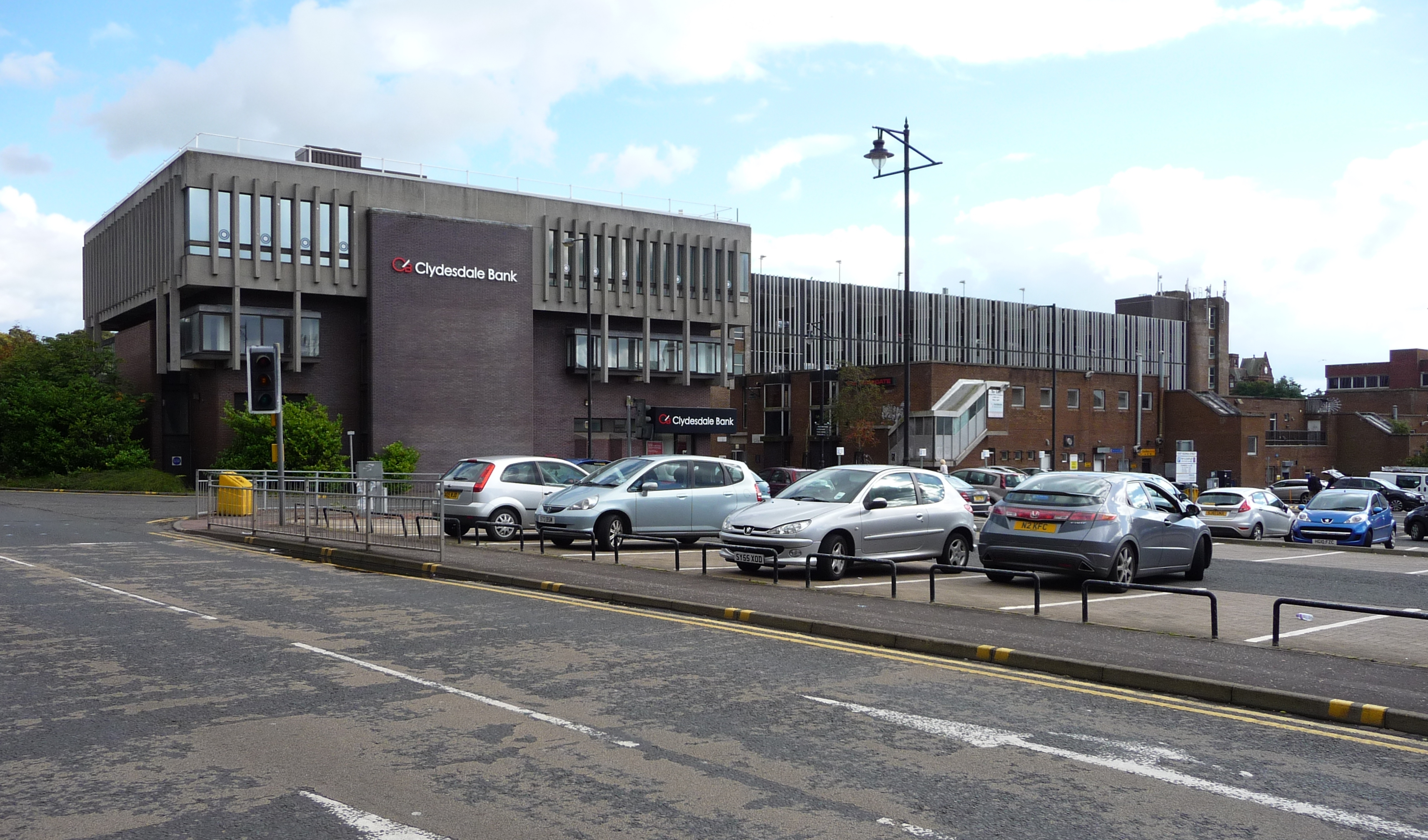
A Clydesdale Bank branch in Kilmarnock

In 1989 National Australia Bank bought the Clydesdale Bank for £420 million. Fred Goodwin, an accountant working for Touche Ross, worked on the acquisition. In 1995 Goodwin, with little direct banking experience, was appointed deputy CEO of the Clydesdale until 1997. During this period Goodwin earned the nickname "Fred the shred" for his aggressive manner in dealing with staff.

In September 2013 the bank was fined £8.9 million after miscalculating the mortgage repayments of more than 42,000 customers.

In March 2015 the House of Commons Treasury Select Committee said in a conduct report that they had evidence that the Clydesdale Bank had mis-sold unregulated tailored business loans and that the bank's own internal review of the mis-selling had serious shortcomings and lacked transparency.

In April 2015 the Clydesdale was fined £20.7 million the largest of its type imposed by the Financial Conduct Authority for the mis-selling of PPI insurance.

=== CYBG plc ===
National Australia Bank confirmed in October 2014 that it planned to exit the UK, and was considering a number of options for Yorkshire and Clydesdale Banks, including a possible stock market listing. In October 2015, NAB confirmed it would float Clydesdale Bank and Yorkshire Bank on the London Stock Exchange (LSE) in February 2016 through an initial public offering, with an aim of raising £2 billion. The bank's newly formed holding company CYBG plc began conditional trading on the LSE and the Australian Securities Exchange on 3 February, and began trading unconditionally from 8 February. The flotation share price of 180p meant that the National Australia Bank made an estimated loss of £2 billion on the sale and had to make provisions of around £1.7 billion to cover claims for mis-selling of products.

In March 2016 CYBG announced the closure of 28 branches as a cost saving move. The following month, CYBG announced the closure of a further 9 Clydesdale branches and 17 Yorkshire Bank branches.

=== Virgin Money ===
In June 2018, CYBG plc announced it would acquire Virgin Money for £1.7 billion in an all-stock deal. Almost one in six employees were expected to lose their jobs in the takeover, which resulted in retail customers being migrated to the Virgin Money brand over three years. The acquisition of Virgin Money was completed on 15 October 2018. In June 2019, CYBG plc announced its plans to consolidate its businesses under the Virgin Money brand. Clydesdale Bank, Yorkshire Bank and B, which existed as trading divisions of Clydesdale Bank plc began to use the Virgin Money name in late 2019 with full use implemented by early 2021. In preparation for rebranding, the existing Virgin Money plc was merged into the existing Clydesdale Bank plc on 21 October 2019.

=== Nationwide ===
Following the acquisition of Virgin Money UK by Nationwide Building Society in October 2024, most of Clydesdale Bank plc's business was legally transferred to Nationwide on 2 April 2026 under a banking business transfer scheme which was approved by the Companies Court on 23 February 2026. Nationwide intends to continue using the Virgin Money name for accounts which are transferred, though Clydesdale Bank mortgages changed to 'Clydesdale' branding. Customers of Virgin Money with a current account, savings account, or mortgage became Nationwide members as a result of the transfer. Clydesdale Bank plc retained the right to issue banknotes in Scotland and most of the assets and liabilities it holds which are not subject to UK law.

== Former operations ==
B's former logo

=== B ===
B was a banking brand in the United Kingdom which operated between 2016 and 2019. B focused on app-based banking and computer learning of personal finances to help customers manage their money.

B offered an app-based current accounts that was paired with a savings account. B's bank cards used the Mastercard system for both debit and credit cards. B also offered a credit card, with a selling point of consistently low interest rates and no foreign transaction fees.

In June 2019 CYBG plc, the parent company of Clydesdale Bank plc announced that the B brand was to be phased out and replaced by the Virgin Money brand in December 2019.

B closed applications for new current accounts on 4 December 2019 and existing B accounts were rebranded as Virgin Money the following day.

=== Yorkshire Bank ===
Yorkshire Bank was a trading name used by Clydesdale Bank plc for its retail banking operations in England.

Yorkshire Bank was acquired by National Australia Bank (NAB) in 1990 and was merged into Clydesdale Bank plc in 2005, continuing to operate as a distinct trading division. In 2016 NAB divested its UK operations as CYBG plc which went on to acquire Virgin Money in 2018. Subsequently the Yorkshire Bank name was phased out with all branches rebranded as Virgin Money.

== Banknotes ==
Following the announcement of the CYBG's takeover of Virgin Money in 2018 and planned phasing-out of the Clydesdale Bank brand by 2021 in favour of Virgin Money, it was announced that Virgin Money would continue to issue banknotes under the Clydesdale brand after 2021.

=== Banknote history ===
Until prevented by the Bank Charter Act 1844, privately owned banks in Great Britain and Ireland were permitted to issue their own banknotes, and money issued by provincial Scottish, English, Welsh and Irish banking companies circulated freely as a means of payment. While the Bank of England eventually gained a monopoly for issuing banknotes in England and Wales, banks in Scotland and Northern Ireland retained the right to issue their own banknotes and continue to do so to this day. In Scotland, Clydesdale Bank, the Royal Bank of Scotland and Bank of Scotland still print their own banknotes.

=== 2009 issue ===
The current designs were released in autumn 2009. The obverse designs feature famous Scots while the reverse designs feature Scotland's UNESCO World Heritage Sites.

Image		Value	Main Colour	Design	
Obverse	Reverse	Value	Main Colour	Obverse	Reverse
		£5	Blue	Sir Alexander Fleming	St Kilda
		£10	Brown	Robert Burns	Edinburgh Old and New Towns
		£20	Purple	King Robert the Bruce	New Lanark
		£50	Green	Elsie Inglis	The Antonine Wall
		£100	Red	Charles Rennie Mackintosh	Neolithic Orkney

=== Previous issue ===
The previous series of Clydesdale notes each depicted a notable person from Scottish history:

- 5 pound note featuring Robert Burns on the obverse and a vignette of a field mouse from Burns' poem To a Mouse on the reverse
- 10 pound note featuring Mary Slessor on the front and a vignette of a map of Calabar and African missionary scenes on the back
- 20 pound note featuring Robert the Bruce on the front and a vignette of the Bruce on horseback with the Monymusk Reliquary against a background of Stirling Castle on the back
- 50 pound note featuring Adam Smith on the front and a vignette of industry tools against a background of sailing ships on the back
- 100 pound note featuring Lord Kelvin on the front and a vignette of the University of Glasgow on the back

An image of Adam Smith also features on the £20 note issued in 2007 by the Bank of England, granting Smith the unique status of being the only person to feature on banknotes issued by two different British banks, and the first Scot to appear on a Bank of England banknote.

=== Older issues ===
The Clydesdale Bank ceased issuing £1 notes in the late 1980s. These latterly had an image of Robert the Bruce, whilst the contemporaneous £20 notes had an image of Lord Kelvin.

The £10 notes issued from 1971 bore an image of Scottish explorer David Livingstone with palm tree leaves and an illustration of African tribesmen on the back. A later issue showed Livingstone against a background graphic of a map of his Zambezi expedition, showing the River Zambezi, Victoria Falls, Lake Nyasa and Blantyre, Malawi; on the reverse, the African figures were replaced with an image of Livingstone's birthplace in Blantyre.

=== Commemorative banknotes ===
Occasionally the Clydesdale Bank issues special commemorative banknotes to mark particular occasions or to celebrate famous people. These notes are much sought after by collectors and they rarely remain long in circulation. Examples to date have included:

- a £5 issued in 1996 to commemorate the poetry of Robert Burns. On the front of the notes is an overprint of his poems above the portrait.
- a £10 issued in 1997 to commemorate the work of Mary Slessor. On the back of the note is the map of Calabar and Mary Slessor along with a group of Africans.
- a £20 to the Commonwealth Heads of Government Meeting in Edinburgh, October 1997, showing on the reverse the Edinburgh International Conference Centre where the meeting was held, along with Edinburgh Castle in the background and the new Clydesdale Bank building at Tollcross, Edinburgh
- a £20 note to mark Glasgow's celebrations as UK City of Architecture and Design, featuring a portrait of Glaswegian architect Alexander "Greek" Thomson; on the reverse is an illustration of the Lighthouse building by Charles Rennie Mackintosh and the dome of Thomson's Holmwood House (1999)
- a £20 to mark the 700th anniversary of Robert the Bruce's coronation, featuring the coat of arms used by the Bruce on the front and a narrative commemorating the anniversary on the rear
- a £10 note to mark the bank's sponsorship of the Scottish Commonwealth Games team, depicting the team logo on the front, and on the rear a montage of all the events at the games (2006)
- a £5 note featuring a portrait of the Scottish civil engineer, Sir William Arrol and the image of the Forth Bridge to mark the 125th anniversary of the construction of the bridge; this issue is noted as it is printed on polymer rather than paper (see below).

=== Polymer banknotes ===
In March 2015, the Clydesdale Bank became the first bank in Great Britain to issue polymer banknotes. The £5 commemorative notes, issued to commemorate the 125th anniversary of the construction of the Forth Bridge, are printed by De La Rue and are the first in Europe to use the company's "Safeguard" polymer substrate security feature. The notes also use the "Spark Orbital" security feature which depicts a reflective map of Scotland over a transparent "window" in the banknote.

Although the Clydesdale's 2015 issue are the first plastic banknotes issued within Great Britain, these are not the first polymer banknotes to be issued in the United Kingdom — in 1999, the Northern Bank (now Danske Bank) issued a series of polymer £5 notes depicting the US Space Shuttle. The Bank of England issued a polymer £5 note for the first time in September 2016.

== Commonwealth Games ==
In March 2005, Clydesdale Bank became one of the official partners of the Scottish Commonwealth Games Team, at the 2006 Commonwealth Games in Melbourne, Australia. This sponsorship builds on the relationship formed by its parent, NAB Group, who are one of the Games' main sponsors as well as a key partner with the Australian team, whilst the sister company, Bank of New Zealand, has joined forces to support its national team. The bank also released a series of Ten Pound (£10) notes with a Commonwealth Games related theme for the occasion.

== See also ==
- List of banks in the United Kingdom
- Banknotes of the pound sterling
