= Richard Banks (banker) =

British banker

Richard Lee Banks CBE is a British banker who is Chief Executive of UK Asset Resolution, the state-owned "bad bank" that was formed from Northern Rock and Bradford & Bingley, when those banks failed in 2008. In 2014, an opinion piece in the Evening Standard asked if he was "Britain's best banker", as he had successfully reduced the assets of UK Asset Resolution by 40 percent and repaid £4bn to the British government.

== Banking career ==
Born in Stockport, Banks graduated with a BA in Business Studies from Manchester Polytechnic. He went on to train as an Associate of the Chartered Institute of Bankers. From 1984 to 1987 he worked at Midland Bank, being promoted to Corporate Finance Executive. He became General Manager of Liverpool-based Girobank, a national-owned bank run through the Post Office network, in 1987. Girobank was taken over by Alliance & Leicester in 1990 and Banks stayed on as Girobank's Director of Corporate Banking until 1996 and then managing director until 2000. During this time he was also a director of VISA UK from 1992 to 1994. He was Distribution Director for Alliance & Leicester Retail Bank from 2000 until 2002 and then returned to head Girobank, now rebranded as Alliance & Leicester Corporate Bank until 2008. In 2008 Alliance & Leicester was taken over by Santander UK and he was briefly Alliance & Leicester's Group Risk Director until the takeover was completed.

He was briefly non-executive director of Chelsea Building Society from April to June 2009, resigning just before they announced £41m of potentially fraudulent loans, which ultimately led to the Society's take-over by Yorkshire Building Society. He then became non-executive director of ICICI Bank UK from 2009 until 2014.

Since 2005 he has been a director of Liverpool Compact, the "Education Business Partnership" set up by Liverpool City Council to provide work experience for 14- to 19-year-olds.

He has been an independent non-executive director at Aldermore since September 2020.

== UK Asset Resolution ==
In April 2009, Banks was recruited as Chief Executive of Bradford & Bingley following its nationalisation six months earlier, when the retail savings and branch network had been sold to Santander UK and the mortgage book was closed to new business. When Bradford & Bingley and Northern Rock were merged in October 2010 he was made Chief Executive of the merged entity.

In 2013 he was revealed as one of the top paid government employees, earning £815,000 – four times as much as the Prime Minister, having had a 27 percent pay rise that year.

By November 2014, UK Asset Resolution under Banks had repaid £4bn to the British government out of its original £16bn loan, assets were down from £110bn to £66bn and mortgage arrears were down to 6 percent. This performance led the Evening Standard to ask if he was "Britain's best banker".

Banks was appointed Commander of the Order of the British Empire (CBE) in the 2016 Birthday Honours for services to taxpayers.
