= Shareholder Executive =

Former UK government body

Agency overview
- Formed: May 2003
- Dissolved: 1 April 2016
- Superseding agency: UK Financial Investments
- Employees: 130
- Minister responsible: Rt Hon. Sajid Javid MP, Secretary of State for Business, Innovation and Skills
- Deputy Minister responsible: Rt Hon. Anna Soubry MP, Minister of State for Small Business, Industry and Enterprise
- Agency executives: Robert Swannell, Chairman; Mark Russell, Chief Executive
- Parent department: Department for Business, Innovation and Skills
- Website: https://www.gov.uk/government/organisations/the-shareholder-executive

The Shareholder Executive (ShEx) was a body within the UK Government between 2003 and 2016, responsible for managing the government's financial interest in a range of state-owned businesses for commercial rather than political interests. It was part of the Department for Business, Innovation and Skills and staffed by civil servants, many of whom were corporate finance professionals with private sector experience. It was led by Mark Russell as chief executive at the time of its merger into UK Government Investments.

== Role ==
The Shareholder Executive managed a portfolio of businesses with a combined turnover of around £12 billion. The businesses varied and could be in the form of a limited company, public limited company, limited liability partnership, statutory corporation, trading fund, executive agency, non-departmental public body or non-ministerial government department.

It advised the government on drafting parts of the Postal Services Act 2011 and worked on the privatisation of Royal Mail and the possible mutualisation of Post Office Ltd. It was also involved in establishing the UK Green Investment Bank, the Public Data Group and the British Business Bank.

It was not responsible for the government's shares in UK banks, which were managed by UK Financial Investments (UKFI), or the government's property holdings, which were managed by the Government Property Unit (GPU).

== History ==
The Shareholder Executive was originally established in September 2003 as part of the Cabinet Office. In 2004 it moved to the Department of Trade and Industry (DTI).

The National Audit Office published a report into the Shareholder Executive in 2007. This was broadly positive but had some misgivings about its location in the DTI.

Following the split of the DTI in 2007, ShEX moved to the Department for Business, Enterprise and Regulatory Reform (BERR) and then to its successor, the Department for Business, Innovation and Skills (BIS) in 2009.

Early interventions by the Shareholder Executive included efforts in 2004–2005 to save distressed carmaker MG Rover, followed by successful interventions to protect the UK operations of Jaguar Land Rover and General Motors. The Shareholder Executive was involved in the government's nationalisation of Northern Rock and Bradford & Bingley at the start of the banking crisis in 2008. It then began the process of splitting off Northern Rock's 'bad bank' mortgage business to form Northern Rock. All bank shareholdings were transferred to UK Financial Investments in November 2008.

In 2011, the Government Property Unit was moved from the Shareholder Executive to the Cabinet Office as part of the new Efficiency and Reform Group.

In 2015, the government announced that the Shareholder Executive would be transferred to HM Treasury and become a subsidiary of UK Government Investments, along with UK Financial Investments. This was due to occur with the end of the government fiscal year on 1 April 2016.

== Key personnel ==
The body's first chief executive was Richard Gillingwater, who moved to the chair role in September 2006 and was replaced by Mark Bryant. Stephen Lovegrove was chief executive from June 2007 to 2013, when he became the permanent secretary at the Department of Energy & Climate Change. Lovegrove was replaced by Mark Russell, who had been deputy chief executive since 2008, and continued as chief executive of UKGI after the 2016 merger.

Non-executive chairmen include:

- 2007–2012: Philip Remnant, previously an executive at the investment banking arm of Credit Suisse, and director general of the Takeover Panel
- 2012–2014: Patrick O'Sullivan, simultaneously deputy governor of the Bank of Ireland and chair of Old Mutual; previously chief financial officer at Zurich Financial Services Group

== Portfolio Unit ==
The Portfolio Unit contained businesses where the Shareholder Executive had a shareholding mandate, although the shares themselves were owned by government departments. Its role was either accountable to ministers directly ('executive'), working alongside shareholding teams within departments ('joint team'), or advising department shareholder teams ('advisory'). Most businesses were wholly owned by the government, but some were partly owned.

=== Department for Business, Energy and Industrial Strategy ===
- Companies House
- Insolvency Service
- Land Registry
- Met Office
- Ordnance Survey
- Post Office
- UK Export Finance
- Urenco (33.3%)

=== Department for Culture, Media and Sport ===
- Channel Four Television Corporation

=== Department for International Development ===
- CDC Group

=== Department for Transport ===
- London and Continental Railways
- NATS Holdings (49%)

=== Department of Energy and Climate Change ===
- National Nuclear Laboratory
- Nuclear Decommissioning Authority
- Nuclear Liabilities Fund

=== HM Treasury ===
- Royal Mint

=== Ministry of Defence ===
- UK Hydrographic Office

== Corporate Finance Practice ==
The Corporate Finance Practice contained businesses where the Shareholder Executive had no clear shareholding mandate. Its role was to provide advice to the relevant government department.

=== Department for Business, Innovation and Skills ===
- Student Loans Company

=== Department for Culture, Media and Sport ===
- Public Sector spectrum

=== Department of Health ===
- Community Health Partnerships
- NHS Professionals
- NHS Shared Business Services (50%)

=== Ministry of Defence ===
- Defence Science and Technology Laboratory

== Former businesses ==
The Shareholder Executive had earlier been responsible for a number of other businesses that were sold, moved to other areas of government or dissolved.

- Actis – remaining stake sold in 2012
- Army Base Repair Organisation – merged into Defence Support Group in 2008
- Bio Products Laboratory – remaining stake sold in 2016
- Bradford & Bingley – moved to UKFI in 2008
- British Energy – remaining stake sold during takeover by EDF Energy in 2009
- British Nuclear Fuels – broken up and ceased activities in 2009
- British Waterways – removed from portfolio to become charitable trust in 2012
- Defence Aviation Repair Agency – merged into Defence Support Group in 2008
- Defence Storage and Distribution Agency – dissolved in 2010
- Defence Support Group – sold to Babcock International in 2015
- Eurostar – remaining stake sold in 2015
- Fire Service College – removed from portfolio in 2007
- Forensic Science Service – dissolved in 2012
- Covent Garden Market Authority – moved to Government Property Unit in 2011
- Northern Ireland Water – removed from portfolio in 2010
- Northern Rock – moved to UKFI in 2008
- Northern Rock (Asset Management) – moved to UKFI in 2008
- Oil and Pipelines Agency – Government Pipelines and Storage System sold to CLH in 2015
- Qinetiq – remaining stake sold in 2008
- Queen Elizabeth II Conference Centre – moved to Government Property Unit in 2011
- Partnerships UK – dissolved in 2011
- Royal Mail – remaining stake sold in 2015
- Scottish Water – removed from portfolio in 2011
- The Tote – sold to Betfred in 2011
- UK Atomic Energy Authority – commercial business unit sold to Babcock International Group in 2009
- UK Green Investment Bank – sold to Macquarie Group in 2017
- Working Links – sold to Aurelius in 2016

== See also ==
- UK Financial Investments
