= Landmark Mortgages =

British asset holding and management company

Landmark Mortgages Limited
- Company type: Limited company
- Industry: Finance
- Founded: 30 October 1996 (as Northern Rock plc); 31 December 2009 (as Northern Rock (Asset Management) plc); 16 May 2014 (as NRAM plc); 18 July 2016 (as Landmark Mortgages Limited)
- Headquarters: Admiral House, Harlington Way, Fleet, Hampshire, England, UK
- Area served: UK
- Services: Mortgages
- Owner: Cerberus Capital Management
- Website: www.landmarkmortgages.com

Landmark Mortgages Limited, formerly Northern Rock (Asset Management) plc and later NRAM plc, is a British asset holding and management company which was split away from the Northern Rock bank in 2010. It was publicly owned through the British Government's UK Asset Resolution following Northern Rock's nationalisation in 2008 until NRAM plc was sold to Cerberus Capital Management in 2016. The company is closed to new business.

NRAM held the bad debts of the former Northern Rock bank and was described as the "bad bank". The remainder, Northern Rock plc, was designated the "good bank", and in 2012 was bought by Virgin Money. Since nationalisation, the assets of NRAM have been sold off in parts, culminating in November 2015 with the sale of £13 billion of mortgages and loans to Cerberus Capital Management. Cerberus purchased NRAM plc as part of the deal in May 2016, renaming it Landmark Mortgages. The remaining liabilities of NRAM that were not included in the sale were transferred to NRAM (No. 1) Limited, which was renamed NRAM Limited.

== History ==
Northern Rock (Asset Management) plc was renamed from Northern Rock plc on 31 December 2009, and the following day the banking assets were split off into a new company called Northern Rock plc. Therefore, the current legal entity which exists as Northern Rock (Asset Management) company is in fact the company of the Northern Rock Building Society (founded 1965) which turned into a bank in 1997.

On 14 September 2007, just before the 2008 financial crisis, the Bank sought and received a liquidity support facility from the Bank of England, following problems in the credit markets caused by the subprime mortgage crisis. At 00:01 on 22 February 2008 the bank was taken into state ownership (see the Nationalisation of Northern Rock). The nationalisation was a result of two unsuccessful bids to take over the bank, neither being able to fully commit to repayment of taxpayers' money. To better control the assets of the bank it was decided to split the company in two, forming the new bank and leaving this company as the so-called 'bad-bank'.

On 24 March 2010 UKFI announced its intention to integrate Northern Rock (Asset Management) plc and Bradford & Bingley plc under a single holding company. In October 2010, Bradford & Bingley plc and Northern Rock (Asset Management) plc were brought together under a single holding company, UK Asset Resolution Ltd.

On 3 August 2010 the company announced pre-tax profits £349.7m for the first six months of the year. On 1 October 2010 the bank announced that another £700 million had been paid off of the loan in the last three months. During 2011 £2 billion of the loan was repaid. On 23 July it was announced that Virgin Money would be acquiring £465 million worth of mortgage assets from Northern Rock (Asset Management) plc.

In December 2012 an administrative error was uncovered in the wording of the loan agreements made by the bank in 2008 for around 152,000 customers; the error may cost an estimated £270 million. As a result of the error the affected customers, who were borrowing £25,000 or less, may be entitled to a repayment of interest. In December 2014, the High Court ruled that the compensation must be paid in a test case that NRAM brought against one of its employees. This was later reversed by the Court of Appeal in July 2015.

In July 2013, private equity firm JC Flowers agreed to buy $450 million of the bank's loans from the British Government.

Former logo of NRAM plc

On 16 May 2014 the company changed its name from Northern Rock (Asset Management) plc to the shorter NRAM plc.

In 2015 UK Financial Investments announced it would seek expressions of interest for the divestment of mortgage servicing capabilities of the business as well as the Granite securitisation vehicle. UKFI appointed Moelis & Company as advisers for the divestments. In November 2015, the company confirmed the sale of £13 billion of mortgages and loans to Cerberus Capital Management, largely made up of a part of its Granite portfolio, for £280m more than their book value. The legal entity of NRAM plc became known as Landmark Mortgages Limited after the sale to Cerberus, and NRAM (No. 1) Limited was renamed to NRAM Limited in 2016. Upon completion of the acquisition of NRAM plc, Cerberus sold £3.3 billion of mortgages to the UK bank TSB, which are administered through its Whistletree division.

== Operations ==
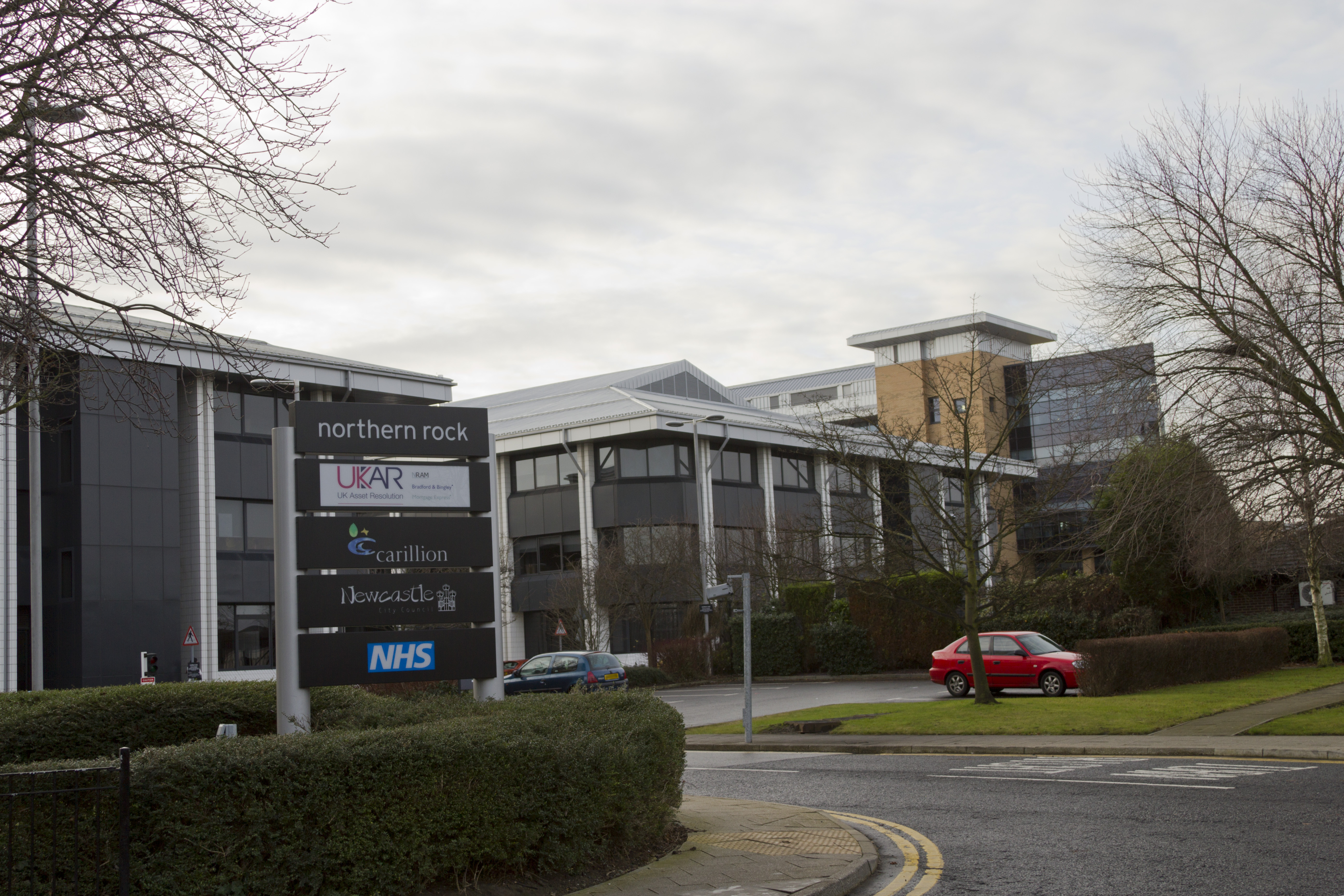
When the company split from the retail Northern Rock bank it was based in buildings at Regent Centre in Gosforth, Newcastle upon Tyne

Northern Rock (Asset Management) holds and services the majority of existing mortgage and unsecured loan accounts. The company does not offer any new products and has no branches. The company is currently based in Fleet, Hampshire.

The Northern Rock (Asset Management) was initially based on the same large site at the Regent Centre in Gosforth, Newcastle upon Tyne as the Northern Rock bank until 2013, when the staff moved to UKAR's other sites in Doxford and Bingley. The registered office was also initially Northern Rock House but is now in Bingley.

NRAM held the assets of the "Granite" securitisation vehicle, created by Northern Rock in 2001 to parcel up the mortgages provided by the bank and sell the value to investors. In 2008 Granite had a value of around £45 billion. After the liquidity crisis and subsequent nationalisation of Northern Rock in February 2008, Granite was put into run-off to reduce exposure for the UK taxpayer, meaning that Northern Rock the bank would no longer supply it with fresh mortgages and bondholders would be repaid as old mortgages expire.

== Shares ==
HM Treasury announced on 22 February 2008 that it had acquired all the shares in Northern Rock and that all entitlements to shares issued by the company had been extinguished by a Transfer Order made under the Banking (Special Provisions) Act 2008. The Transfer Order came into force, and the transfers under it were made at 00:01 on 22 February 2008. Therefore, shares cannot be bought or sold.

Permanent Subordinated Bonds (PSBs) were issued by Northern Rock and although the fixed dividend payments are currently suspended the PSBs are still traded (symbol NRKP). Their coupon is 12 5/8% and as at January 2012 they trade at just under half their issue price of 100p. Although interest is not currently paid it may be at some future point should NRAM cease to be government owned and in that case all back payments of interest may become payable.

== Board of directors ==
Since the company split into two parts, each separate entity has had its own board of directors. With the merger of this company with the mortgage assets of Bradford & Bingley under a single holding company, Richard Pym, Chairman of both companies is to be appointed chairman new holding company, and Richard Banks, currently managing director of Bradford & Bingley has been appointed Chief Executive designate.

Northern Rock (Asset Management) board as of 1 January 2011:

- Chairman: Richard Pym
- Chief Executive: Richard Banks
- Executive Directors: Andy Tate
- non-executive directors: Kent Atkinson, Sue Langley, Keith Morgan, Philip Remnant

== See also ==
- Partnership House
