= Zara Hodgson =

British nuclear engineer

Zara Hodgson FREng is a British engineer who is a professor of nuclear engineering and director of the Dalton Nuclear Institute at the University of Manchester. She is an expert in nuclear engineering and policy, and has advised the Government of the United Kingdom on the production of nuclear fuels and the transition to net-zero emissions.

== Early life and education ==
Hodgson studied chemical engineering at the University of Bath.

== Research and career ==
Hodgson worked at the United Kingdom National Nuclear Laboratory. During her time at the National Nuclear Laboratory, her team produced an isotope of lead (lead-212) for cancer treatment. She spent time at the Nuclear Innovation & Research Office, a consultancy that provides technical advice to government on de-risking nuclear investments, and on secondment to Department for Business, Energy and Industrial Strategy. From 2020 to 2024, Hodgson led nuclear fuel policy for Department for Energy Security and Net Zero. Hodgson focussed on Advanced Modular Reactors, which use new cooling systems and fuels. She established a nuclear skills and innovation programme, and proposed building a nuclear skills and innovation campus.

Hodgson was appointed Director of the Dalton Nuclear Institute in 2024, awarded over £4 million from UK Research and Innovation to work on energy resilience. She has encouraged the Government of the United Kingdom to invest in nuclear research, arguing that it should play a critical role in the UK's future energy mix. She said that nuclear can complement renewable energy sources. She advocated for Urenco Group to build a uranium enrichment facility in Cheshire.

Hodgson was elected Fellow of the Royal Academy of Engineering in 2025.
