= UK Government Investments =

Holding company of UK Government-owned companies

UK Government Investments Limited
- Type: State owned holding company
- Predecessors: Shareholder Executive; UK Financial Investments
- Founded: 1 April 2016; 10 years ago
- Headquarters: London, England, UK
- Key people: Vindi Banga (Chairman); Harry Hampson (CEO)
- Parent: HM Treasury
- Website: www.ukgi.org.uk

UK Government Investments (UKGI) is a company owned by the United Kingdom government which combines the former functions of the Shareholder Executive and UK Financial Investments. UKGI manages a portfolio of businesses, including Channel Four Television Corporation and previously NatWest Group.

The only shareholder is HM Treasury, and the company's board is accountable to Treasury ministers.

== History ==
The company was incorporated in 2015 and is based in London. When its incorporation was announced, it was stated that it was formed as part of the government's plans to "deliver the biggest ever sale of publicly-owned corporate and financial assets in 2015–16, exceeding £23 billion in real terms". By merging the Shareholder Executive and UK Financial Investments under UKGI, whilst keeping their functions in separate divisions, the aim was to improve the collaboration needed to deliver the government's goal of selling public assets to provide value for taxpayers.

The Contingent Liability Central Capability (CLCC) was established within UKGI in April 2021, with the purpose of reviewing and reporting on the government's contingency liability, to provide advice and analytics and to promote best practice within the government. It was later announced that the CLCC would be led by Siobhan Duffy. Also in 2021, the government announced a £400 million investment in OneWeb, the satellite firm that had gone bankrupt in March, with the objective of replacing the use of the EU's Galileo system. UKGI acted as an advisor to the government department responsible for the investment. In the same month, a trading plan was announced by the government to sell some of the government's shares in NatWest Group plc, a plan approved by the Chancellor and based on advice provided by UKGI.

After investigating a different ownership model for Channel 4, in January 2023 the government announced that the broadcaster would remain in public ownership. Prior to this, Alex Mahon, CEO of the broadcaster, had said that decisions made about Channel 4's ownership would be made by the government and UKGI. UKGI advised the government to re-purchase over 36,000 military homes in 2024; they had been sold to a private investment firm in 1996 and were managed by Annington, in a deal that is widely considered to have been a privatisation failure for the government.

At the beginning of 2025, it was announced that the Reclaim Fund Limited, managed by UKGI, had given £1 billion of dormant assets to good causes. This came three years after the Dormant Assets Act 2022 expanded the scheme – established to receive money from dormant bank and building society accounts – to include the investment, wealth management, securities and insurance sectors. On 30 May 2025, UKGI sold the last of the UK government's shares in NatWest Group. Harry Hampson, originally appointed as Director of Corporate Finance in July 2025, was announced as the new CEO of UKGI in December 2025 and commenced the role at the end of January 2026.

== List of companies ==
As of August 2025, the public sector and state owned enterprises, wholly or partially owned, which UKGI works with are:

- AWE Nuclear Security Technologies
- British Business Bank
- Channel Four Television Corporation
- Defence Equipment and Support
- Eutelsat OneWeb (10.9%)
- Government Property Agency
- National Energy System Operator
- National Highways
- National Wealth Fund
- Network Rail
- Nuclear Decommissioning Authority
- Ordnance Survey
- Post Office
- Reclaim Fund
- Royal Mint
- Sheffield Forgemasters
- Sizewell C nuclear power station (44.9%)
- UK Asset Resolution
- UK Export Finance
- United Kingdom National Nuclear Laboratory
- Urenco Group (33.3%)

== Senior leadership ==
- Chairman: Vindi Banga (since September 2021)
- Chief executive: Harry Hampson (since January 2026)

=== List of former chairmen ===
1. Robert Swannell (2016–2021)

=== List of former chief executives ===
1. Mark Russell (2016–2019), who had been deputy chief executive at the Shareholder Executive since 2008 and chief executive of that body from 2013 until its merger into UKGI.
2. Charles Donald (2020–2026)
