= M. S. Banga =

Indian-born British businessman (born 1954)

Manvinder 'Vindi' Banga
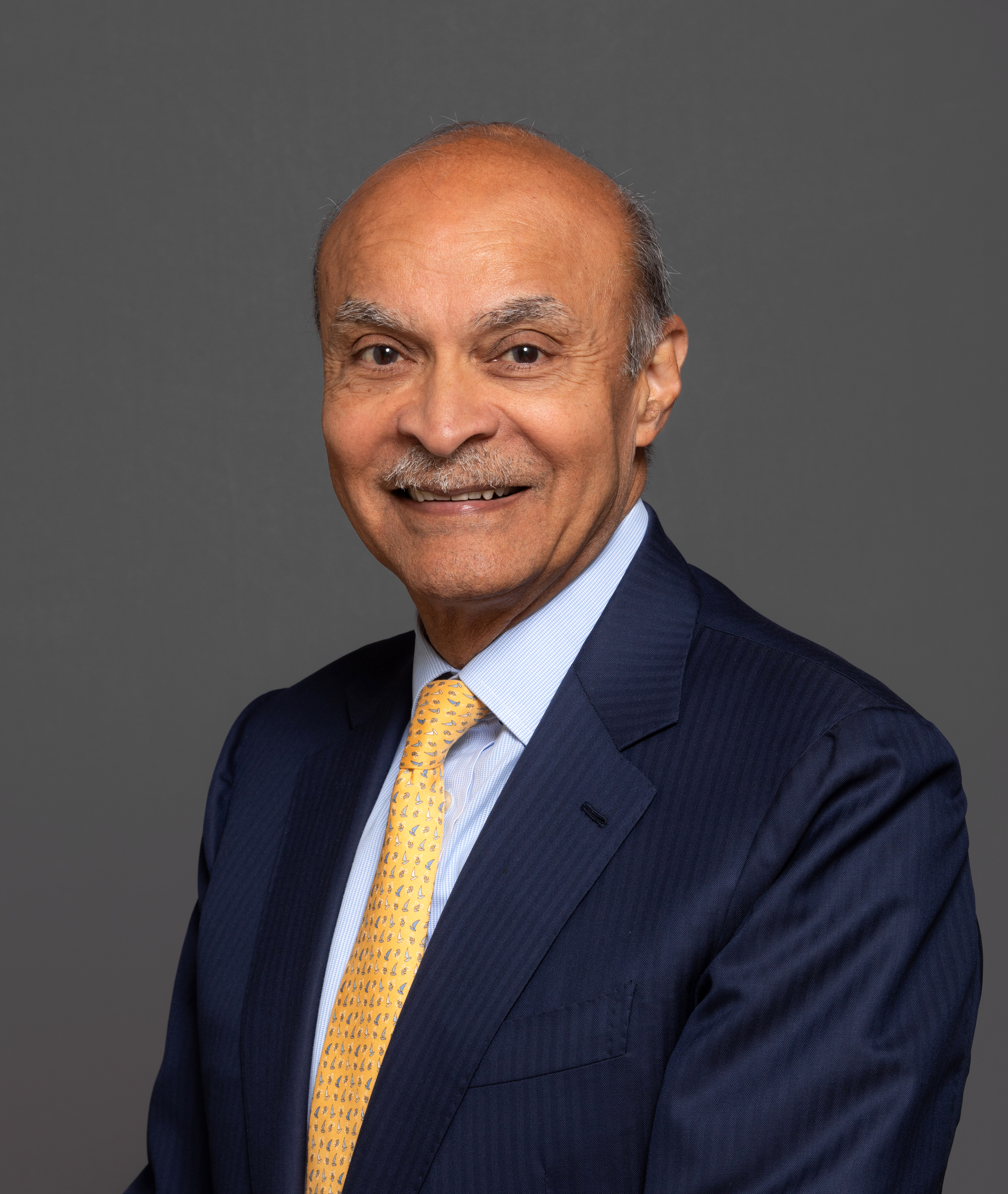
- Born: Manvinder Singh Banga; 1954 (age 71–72); Simla, Punjab, India (now in Himachal Pradesh)
- Education: IIT Delhi (B.Tech.); IIM Ahmedabad (MBA)
- Spouse: Kamini
- Children: 2
- Relatives: Ajay Banga (brother)

Manvinder "Vindi" Singh Banga is an British business leader, corporate chair, and philanthropist of Indian origin. He serves as Chairman of Haleon PLC, Chair of the Council of Imperial College London, and Chair of UK Government Investments (UKGI), the UK government's centre of expertise in corporate governance and corporate finance.

He is a senior partner at the global private equity firm Clayton, Dubilier & Rice (CD&R) since 2010, and was previously Chairman and CEO of Hindustan Unilever during a 33-year career.

== Early life ==
Vindi was born on October 31, 1954 in Simla (then in the state of Punjab, now in Himachal Pradesh), the son of Lt.Gen. Harbhajan Singh Banga, of the Indian Army, and his wife, Jaswant. His younger brother Ajay Banga is also a business leader and President of the World Bank.

== Education ==
Banga graduated with a B.Tech in Mechanical Engineering from the Indian Institute of Technology, Delhi in 1975, where he was awarded a gold medal.

He subsequently earned an MBA from the Indian Institute of Management, Ahmedabad, where again he was awarded a gold medal.

== Career ==
=== Unilever (1977–2010) ===
Banga spent 33 years at Unilever. He held a series of increasingly senior roles across Asia and globally, culminating in his appointment to the Unilever Executive Board as President, Foods in 2005, with additional responsibility for Home & Personal Care added in 2008.

From 2000 to 2005 he served as Chairman and Managing Director of Hindustan Unilever Limited (HUL), Unilever's listed subsidiary in India.

=== Clayton, Dubilier & Rice (2010–present) ===
Banga joined Clayton, Dubilier & Rice as a Senior Partner in 2010. He chairs CD&R's Sustainability Council and established the firm's presence in India through a partnership with Kedaara Capital Advisers.

He has chaired and served on the boards of several CD&R portfolio companies:

- Diversey, Inc. – Chair of the Executive Committee from 2010 until the company's sale to Sealed Air Corporation in a transaction valued at $4.3 billion, announced in June 2011 and completed in October that year.
- B&M Retail – Director from 2012 to 2014. The company completed an initial public offering on the London Stock Exchange in June 2014, the biggest listing on the London Stock Exchange that year, and is a constituent of the FTSE 250 Index.
- Mauser Group – Chair from 2014 to 2017. The German bulk packaging company was sold to Stone Canyon Industries in an all-cash transaction valued at approximately $2.3 billion in April 2017, having previously filed for an IPO on the NYSE.
- Morrisons – Board Member since the supermarket chain was taken private by CD&R in October 2021 in a transaction valued at approximately £7 billion. In May 2022, Morrisons acquired McColl's Retail Group out of administration, with all 16,000 McColl's employees transferred to Morrisons.

=== Non-executive and public board roles ===
- Banga was a Non-Executive Director of Maruti Suzuki (India) from 2003 until 2012.
- He was a Non-Executive Director of Thomson Reuters Corporation from 2009 until May 2016.
- He served as a Non-Executive Director and Senior Independent Director of Marks & Spencer plc from September 2009 until September 2016.
- Banga joined the board of GlaxoSmithKline (GSK) as a Non-Executive Director on 1 September 2015, succeeding Sir Deryck Maughan as Senior Independent Director from 5 May 2016. He served until July 2022.
- Following the demerger of GSK's consumer healthcare division on 18 July 2022, Banga joined the board of the newly listed Haleon plc as Senior Independent Director. Haleon is a FTSE 100 company listed on the London Stock Exchange. He was appointed Chairman of Haleon with effect from 1 January 2026, succeeding Sir Dave Lewis.
- He is a Non-Executive Director of The Economist Group (since 2020).

=== UK Government Investments ===
- Banga was appointed Chair of UK Government Investments (UKGI) in September 2021.
- He was reappointed for a second three-year term commencing September 2024.

=== Academic institutions ===
- Banga has been Chair of Council at Imperial College London since 1 April 2024, succeeding John Allan CBE as the 14th holder of the role. Imperial is a science, technology and business university with approximately 20,000 students, ranked among the world's top universities. His other board and advisory roles in education have included:
- Board Member of the Indian Institute of Management, Ahmedabad (2000–2005).
- Was Executive & Supervisory Board Member of the Indian School of Business, Hyderabad from its founding in 2001, with founding partnerships from Wharton, Kellogg and London Business School.
- Member of the Advisory Board of the Wharton School.
- Member of the Global Advisory Council of Saïd Business School, University of Oxford (2016–2024).

=== Charitable and public sector activities ===
- Banga served as Chair of Marie Curie, the UK's largest palliative care charity, from 2017 until 31 December 2024.
- He is a Commissioner on the Global Commission on Modern Slavery and Human Trafficking, which is currently chaired by Theresa May.
- He has been a Board Member of the International Chamber of Commerce (UK Chapter) since 2021.
- He was a Member of the World Economic Forum Global Future Council until 2023.
- He was a Board Member of the Confederation of British Industry (CBI) until 2019 and Chair of its Economic Growth Committee until 2017.
- He was a judge on the Financial Times Business Book of the Year Award from 2010 to 2013.
- He and his wife Kamini have established the Kamini and Vindi Banga Family Trust, registered as a charity in January 2017, which supports cancer research and education primarily in the United Kingdom.

== Awards and honours ==
- Distinguished Alumni Award, Indian Institute of Technology, Delhi (2001).
- CNBC International Businessman Award (December 2009).
- Padma Bhushan (2010): Awarded by the President of India, one of India's highest civilian honours, for outstanding contribution to business.

== Personal life ==
Banga is married to Kamini; they have two sons, both based in the United Kingdom. His eldest son, Tavarj Banga, is Partner & Co-Head at Helios Climate. His second son, Udaibir Banga, is Managing Director at CVC Capital Partners.

His younger brother is Ajay Banga, President of the World Bank Group.

== See also ==
- List of IIT Delhi people
