= EBPO =

EBPO may refer to:

- Education Business Partnership, a British type of business organisation
- Euro (Cyrillic: ЕВРО, Greek: ΕΥΡΩ), the European common currency
