= EBP =

EBP may refer to:

- EBP (gene), encoding the emopamil binding protein
- EBP register, a processor register in the IA-32 instruction set, typically used to hold the stack base pointer (the address of the current stack frame)
- Earth BioGenome Project
- Education Business Partnership, in the United Kingdom
- Efficiency Bandwidth Product, one of the Thiele/Small parameters
- Estradiol-binding protein
- Eurasian Boxing Parliament, a boxing organisation
- Evidence-based policing
- Evidence-based policy, in public policy
- Evidence-based practice, in medicine
- Extra base power, a baseball statistic that was a predecessor of slugging percentage
