= Bradford Equitable Building Society =

- Company type: Building Society (Mutual)
- Industry: other credit granting
- Founded: 1851
- Defunct: 1964
- Fate: Merger
- Successor: Bradford & Bingley Building Society
- Headquarters: Bradford, United Kingdom

Bradford Equitable Building Society was an English building society, which merged with the Bingley Building Society in 1964 to form the Bradford & Bingley Building Society. Bradford & Bingley fell victim to the 2008 financial crisis and is now part of Santander UK, while its mortgage book is owned by UK Financial Investments Limited.

== History ==
The Bradford Second Equitable Building Society, as it was known for most of its existence, was formed in Bradford in 1851. The reason for it being the “Second” is that in 1846 the Bradford Equitable Building and Investment Company had been formed as a terminating society (i.e. on achieving its objectives, it was wound up). The need for a more permanent organisation led to the formation of the “Bradford Second” and the two societies had several directors in common.

By the end of its first year the society had 503 shareholders and 54 borrowers. Early advances were typically on houses under construction, paid in installments. Borrowers were builders and property investors. The foreword to Francis Lumb's history proclaimed that “There is nothing spectacular in this history” but this reflected a conservatism that allowed it to survive recessions and financial panics alike. Like many societies, Bradford Second did not immediately incorporate under the Building Societies Act 1874, valuing the long-standing importance of the trustees over the benefits of limited liability. After lengthy debate, it eventually incorporated in 1882. Another example of the society's attitude to limited liability was in 1879 when three Bradford banks proposed adopting that structure; the response was to spread the money around.

Geographic expansion was slow but steady until World War I – the first agencies were not opened in the Bradford suburbs until 1914. The Leeds Equitable Building Society was acquired in 1921 and during the 1920s, the Society's assets quadrupled. In 1930 a London office was opened but the only other branch in theinter-war years was at Enfield in 1938. After WWII the Society began a more vigorous branch expansion. Between 1945 and 1948, eleven branches were opened. Unlike its future partner, the Bingley, there was a wider geographic spread and a concentration on the larger cities – Birmingham, Bristol, Glasgow, Leeds and Liverpool. In that same period, the merger of the Leeds Provincial with the Bradford Third Equitable enabled the Society to simplify its name to the Bradford Equitable Building Society. Another eight branches followed in the early 1960s and then came the merger approach from the neighbouring Bingley Building Society The merger was implemented in 1964 and the Bradford and Bingley became the eighth largest building society with total assets of more than £100 million, and a national branch network of more than 50 branches.
