= Bingley Building Society =

British building society, 1846–1964

- Type: Building Society (Mutual)
- Founded: 1846
- Defunct: 1964
- Fate: Merger
- Successor: Bradford & Bingley Building Society
- Headquarters: Bingley, United Kingdom

Bingley Building Society was a UK building society, which merged with the Bradford Equitable Building Society in 1964 to form the Bradford & Bingley Building Society. Bradford & Bingley fell victim to the 2008 financial crisis and is now part of Santander UK, while its mortgage book is owned by UK Financial Investments.

== Early history ==
The Bingley Building and Investment Society was formed in 1846 as a temporary society. As it developed, some of its directors wanted more than the temporary status and in 1851 formed the Bingley, Morton and Shipley Permanent Benefit Building Society (Morton and Shipley being two local villages). The society suffered a serious setback in 1864 when the Secretary embezzled funds which had to be financed by a 5% levy on both borrowers and depositors. In 1871, collections began in Keighley and the society was renamed Bingley, Morton, Shipley and Keighley Permanent Benefit Building Society. In 1878, trade in the woollen mills began to slacken and the Society's level of assets was not exceeded until 1898.

== A Local Society ==
From the beginning, business was conducted "in various temporary offices" until in 1892 the Society bought two houses to convert into its own offices. The Society stayed there until 1911 when it moved into a newly built office block. It was not until 1929 that Bingley opened its first branch, prophetically in Bradford; some attempt at geographic expansion, however, had been demonstrated by the increase in collection facilities, by then available in 14 towns in Lancashire and Yorkshire. That was also the year that the name was shortened to Bingley Building Society. After Bradford, branches were opened in neighbouring Keighley and Shipley in 1930, and a representative office in London in 1934.

== Late expansion ==
It was not until the late 1950s that there was any further significant expansion in Bingley's branch network. An office had been opened in Manchester in 1946 but then between 1957 and 1961 a further 18 branches were opened. These were still predominantly in the north apart from three `Bs` - Birmingham, Basildon and Brighton. By 1959, Bingley claimed to be the 18th largest building society and in 1962 moved again to larger offices. All of Bingley's expansion had been organic but there was one peculiarity in 1963 when it was approached by the Kendal Model Benefit Society; this had only 100 depositors and 11 borrowing members; its business was duly absorbed by Bingley.

Later that year, an altogether different merger was being planned when Bingley opened discussions with the nearby Bradford Equitable. The Bingley had assets of £47m. compared to Bradford's £57m. there was an equal number of directors from each side; the new Bradford & Bingley Building Society was to be based in the Bingley office and the merger went through in 1964, making it the eight largest society in the country.
