= UK Asset Resolution =

Financial services holding company of the United Kingdom government

UK Asset Resolution Limited
- Type: State-owned limited company
- Industry: Finance
- Founded: October 2010
- Headquarters: 27–28 Eastcastle Street, London, England, UK
- Key people: John Tattersall, Chairman
- Products: Financial services
- Total assets: £343m (2023)
- Owner: HM Government
- Number of employees: 0 (2023)
- Parent: UK Government Investments
- Website: www.ukar.co.uk

UK Asset Resolution (UKAR) is a British financial services holding company with headquarters in the West Yorkshire village of Crossflatts (near Bradford & Bingley's former headquarters in Bingley). It was established in October 2010 as a bad bank to hold the two run-off elements, Bradford & Bingley (including the Mortgage Express brand) and NRAM plc (previously known as Northern Rock Asset Management), of the two nationalised banks during the 2008 financial crisis.

Having completed the disposal of the final mortgage books in October 2021, UKAR now has no employees. It remains a government-owned entity, with PricewaterhouseCoopers handling any activities that arise as it is wound down.

== History ==
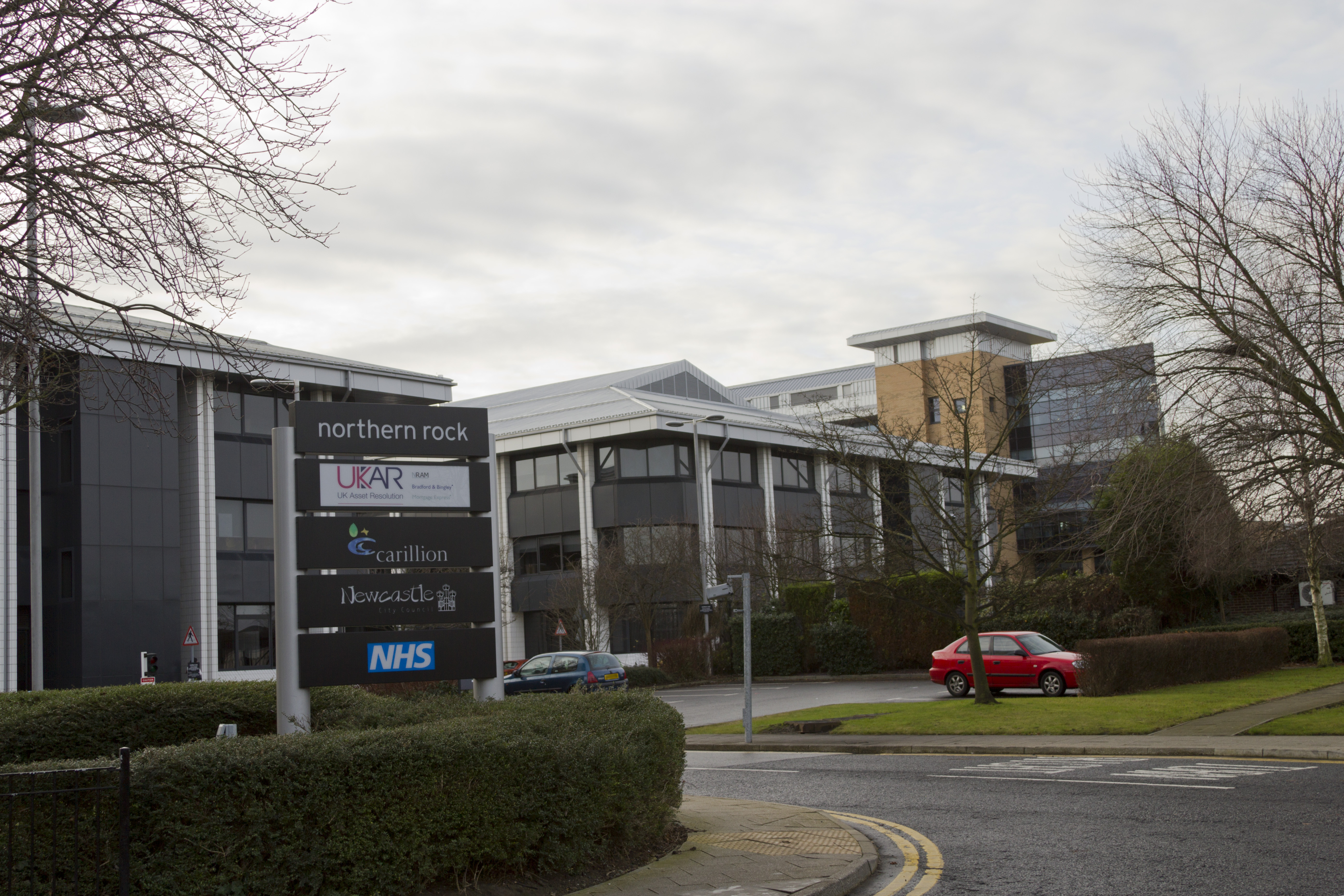
The 'Northern Rock' buildings in Gosforth, Newcastle upon Tyne which housed some of UKAR's staff.

On 22 June 2012 Virgin Money, owners of the Northern Rock bank, acquired the remainder of the NRAM Gosforth site, and the following month UKAR sold £465 million of mortgages from the NRAM portfolio to Virgin. UKAR left their Gosforth, Newcastle upon Tyne (Northern Rock / Regent Centre) offices in 2013, and moved those remaining staff to Doxford and Bingley.

In 2011 UKAR repaid £2.15 billion to taxpayers and in 2012 paid a further £4 billion.

In August 2013, the bank said it has now returned £6.6 billion to the government. It owed £48.7 billion when it was created in October 2010.

In 2014 £2.7 billion of the mortgage book was agreed to be sold to Commercial First, a consortium led by JP Morgan.

In 2015 UKFI announced that it would seek expressions of interest for the divestment of mortgage servicing capabilities of the NRAM business as well as the Granite securitisation vehicle. UKFI appointed Moelis & Company as advisers for the divestments. On 13 November 2015, UKAR confirmed the sale of NRAM's Granite mortgage portfolio to Cerberus Capital Management for £13 billion.

On 31 March 2017 it was announced by HM Treasury that the sale of buy-to-let mortgages from the Bradford & Bingley loan book to Prudential plc and funds managed by The Blackstone Group had been agreed for £11.8 billion.

At 31 March 2020, UKAR and its subsidiaries had a total mortgage book of £4.7bn, down by £94.7bn since its establishment in 2010.

On 26 February 2021, UKAR announced the sale of its final assets from Bradford & Bingley and Northern Rock at a price of £5 billion to a consortium of Citibank and Davidson Kempner Capital Management LP. This transaction consisted of two steps: UKAR sold the remaining loan portfolio to Citibank and Davidson acquired the government’s equity in Bradford & Bingley and NRAM. This concluded the government’s ownership of both institutions. UKAR will have no staff going forward but remains a government-owned entity, with PricewaterhouseCoopers handling any activities that arise.

UKAR's subsidiary UKAR Corporate Services was wound down and dissolved on 17 January 2023.

== See also ==
- UK Financial Investments
- Bad Bank
