= Richard Gillingwater =

British businessman and civil servant (born 1956)

- Born: Richard Dunnell Gillingwater; July 1956 (age 70)
- Education: Oxford University; IMD Lausanne
- Occupations: Chairman, SSE plc Chairman, Janus Henderson Group plc Pro-chancellor, Open University
- Board member of: SSE plc Janus Henderson Group plc Helical Bar

Richard Dunnell Gillingwater CBE (born July 1956) is a British businessman and former public servant, chairman of Janus Henderson Group plc, former chairman of SSE plc, and the pro-chancellor of the Open University.

Richard Dunnell Gillingwater was born in July 1956.

Gillingwater has a law degree from Oxford University, and an MBA from IMD Lausanne.

In 2003, he led a team of civil servants who worked on corporate finance in the Department for Trade and Industry as they transitioned into the Shareholder Executive, created to professionalise the government’s management of its commercial shareholdings. He was chief executive of the new body until September 2006, when he became its chair. While in this role he was appointed CBE in the 2008 Birthday Honours, for services to the financial services industry.

Gillingwater was the chairman of SSE plc from July 2015 to July 2020, having been a non-executive director since May 2007. He was the pro-chancellor of the Open University between 2015 and 2018. He is the chairman of Janus Henderson Group plc, and a non-executive director of Helical Bar plc.
