= Mark Francis Russell =

British businessman (born 1960)

Chief Executive, Shareholder Executive
- In office April 2013 – November 2019
- Prime Minister: David Cameron
- Minister: Vince Cable (until May 2015), Sajid Javid (since May 2015)
- Preceded by: Stephen Lovegrove

Personal details
- Born: 22 May 1960 (age 65)

Mark Francis Russell (born May 1960) is a British businessman and public servant, who since 2019 has chaired Defence Equipment & Support (DE&S), the procurement organisation of the UK Ministry of Defence. Previously he was the chief executive of the British government's Shareholder Executive from 2013, and chief executive of the successor body UK Government Investments from 2016 to 2019.

Russell joined ShEx in 2004 as the director of Corporate Finance Practice, becoming its deputy chief executive in 2007, and chief executive in 2013 after Stephen Lovegrove moved to be the permanent secretary of the Department of Energy and Climate Change. As of September 2015, Russell was paid a salary of between £160,000 and £164,999, making him one of the 328 most highly paid people in the British public sector at that time.

He took up the role of chair of DE&S in November 2019, continuing for a time as vice chair of UKGI. Since February 2021 he has been chair of railway rolling stock company Angel Trains.
