= RadBall =

The RadBall is a 140-millimetre (5.5-inch) diameter deployable, passive, non-electrical gamma hot-spot imaging device that offers a 360 degree view of the deployment area. The device is particularly useful in instances where the radiation fields inside a nuclear facility are unknown but required in order to plan a suitable nuclear decommissioning strategy. The device has been developed by the UK's National Nuclear Laboratory and consists of an inner spherical core made of a radiation sensitive material and an outer tungsten based collimation sheath. The device does not require any electrical supply or communication link and can be deployed remotely thus eliminating the need for radiation exposure to personnel. In addition to this, the device has a very wide target dose range of between 2 and 5,000 rads (20 mGy to 50 Gy) which makes the technology widely applicable to nuclear decommissioning applications.

== The device ==
The device consists of two constituent parts, a gamma radiation sensitive inner core which fits inside the spherical tungsten outer collimation sheath. The outside diameter of the device is 140 mm (approx 5 ½ inch) which allows deployment in to hard to reach areas whilst providing a 360 degree view of the area. The inner core is made up of material which changes colour when it is exposed to gamma radiation. Therefore, when the device is deployed inside a radioactive environment the collimation device preferentially allows gamma radiation to pass through the collimation holes which deposits tracks within the inner core. These tracks can then be analysed to provide a 3D visualisation of the radioactive environment predicting both source location and intensity.

== Deployment and retrieval ==
The overall radiation mapping service based on the device consists of six individual steps. Step 1 involves placing the device inside the given contaminated area with a known position and orientation. This can be achieved in a number of ways including deployment by crane, robot, by an operator or (as in most cases) by a remotely operated manipulator arm. The device can be orientated either upright or upside down. Once the device has been placed in position, Step 2 involves leaving the device in-situ to enable dose uptake. Once the device has been left in-situ and has achieved a suitable dose uptake (between 2 and 5,000 rads), Step 3 involves removing the device from the contaminated area. Once clearance has been given, Step 4 involves removing the radiation sensitive core from within the collimation device, ensuring that it has not rotated or moved during the deployment period.

== Analysis and visualisation ==
Step 5 involves scanning the radiation sensitive core using an optical technique which digitises the information captured by the inner core. Step 6 involves the interpretation of this data set to produce a final visualisation. For each detected track within the inner core special software creates a line of best fit for the data points provided and chooses the direction of the track by using the intensity values. This line of best fit is extrapolated until it intersects with a wall of the deployment volume. This indicates that the radiation source is on the wall at this location or anywhere along the line of sight between the device and the point on the wall. If two devices are deployed in different locations within the same deployment area, triangulation can be used to predict where along the extrapolated line the radiation source is.

Some typical examples of RadBall visualisations
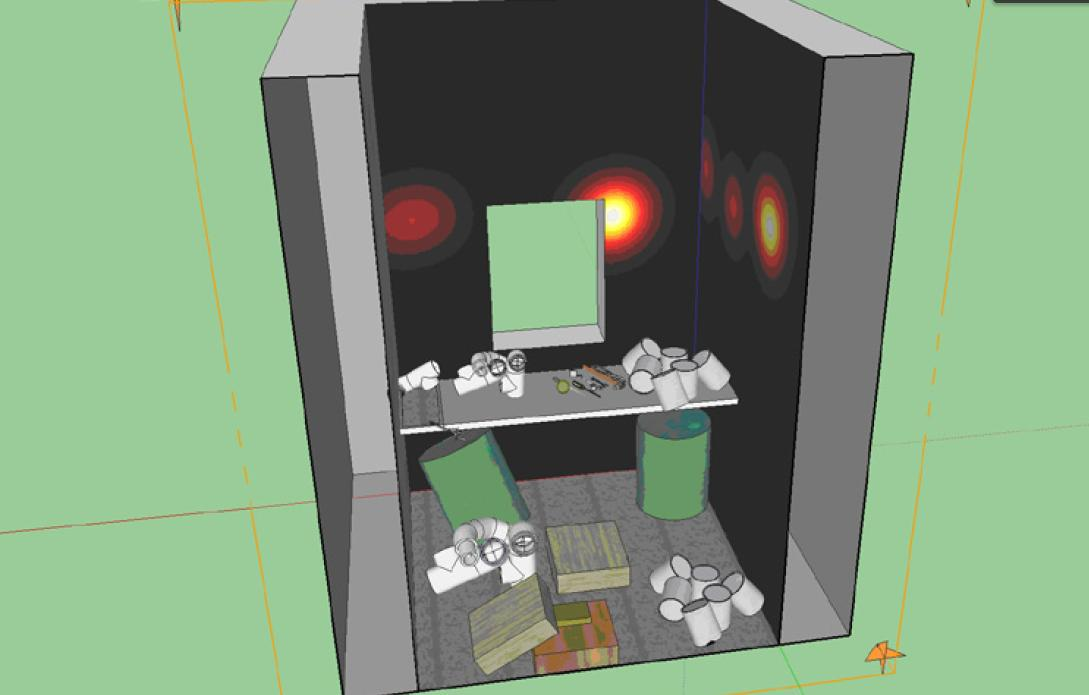
3D representation of hotcell showing cell contents and detected radiation on walls

== Benefits over existing technology ==
A number of alternative technologies and approaches do exist ranging from the use of GM based detectors mounted on a manipulator and moved around a radioactive cell to heavily shielded and collimated gamma-based camera. The technology tested here does have a number of advantages over the aforementioned. With regard to the GM / manipulator approach, the technology has directional awareness, an ability to distinguish separate sources which are in close proximity, there is no need for a power or data umbilical and the technology can be used in areas where a manipulator is not present. With regard to the heavily collimated gamma camera technology, the technology also has a number of advantages including a much more compact size, less weight, no power and data umbilical as well as offering a lower financial risk should the equipment become contaminated.

== Deployment history ==
The technology has been successfully deployed a number of times throughout the US and the UK as described below.

=== Savannah River Site, USA ===
The earliest lab based tests undertaken on the original version of the technology was performed at the Savannah River Site (SRS) Health Physics Instrument Calibration Laboratory (HPICL) using various gamma-ray sources and an x-ray machine with known radiological characteristics. The objective of these preliminary tests was to identify the optimal target dose and collimator thickness of the device. The second set of tests involved the deployment of device in a contaminated Hot Cell in order to characterise the radiation sources within. This work is described in a number of previous publications, primarily in a report commissioned by the US Department of Energy, but also in a number of journal publications. and general industrial news outlets.

=== Hanford Site, USA ===
Further testing of the original device was undertaken in order to demonstrate that the technology could locate submerged radiological hazards. This study involved, for the first time, underwater deployments at the US Department of Energy Hanford Site. This study represents the first successful underwater deployment of technology and a further step in demonstrating that the technology has the ability to be remotely deployed with no electrical supplies into difficult to access areas and locate radiation hazards. This study was part of ongoing work to investigate whether the technology is able to characterize more complex radiation environments as described previously.

=== Oak Ridge National Laboratory, USA ===
A number of trials took place at the US Department of Energy Oak Ridge National Laboratory (ORNL) during December 2010 as described previously. The overall objective for these trials was to demonstrate that a newly developed technology could be used to locate, quantify and characterise the radiological hazards within two separate Hot Cells (B and C). For Hot Cell B, the primary objective of demonstrating that the technology could be used to locate, quantify and characterise 3 radiological sources has been met with 100% success. Despite more challenging conditions in Hot Cell C, two sources were detected and accurately located. To summarise, the technology performed extremely well with regard to detecting and locating radiation sources and, despite the challenging conditions, moderately well when assessing the relative energy and intensity of those sources.

=== Sellafield Site, UK ===
More recently during Winter 2011 the technology was successfully deployed on the UK's Sellafield Site in order to map the whereabouts of numerous radioactive containers within a Shielded Cell Facility. This particular project involved the deployment of three devices and represents the first instance in which triangulation was demonstrated. Overall the technology performed well by locating and quantifying around a dozen sources. This work package was undertaken in partnership with Sellafield Ltd.
