= Robert Swannell =

British businessman and public servant (born 1950)

- Born: Robert William Ashburnham Swannell; 18 November 1950 (age 75); Nanyuki, Kenya
- Title: Former chairman, Marks & Spencer
- Term: 2011–2017
- Successor: Archie Norman
- Board member of: Marks & Spencer
- Children: 2

Robert William Ashburnham Swannell CBE (born 18 November 1950) is a British businessman, public servant and former investment banker. He was the chairman of Marks & Spencer from 2011 to 2017, and chairman of the Shareholder Executive and its successor UK Government Investments from 2014 to 2021.

== Personal life ==
Swannell was born on 18 November 1950 in Nanyuki, Kenya. He attended Rugby School in Warwickshire where he was chairman of the governing board. Swannell is married and has two children.

== Career ==
Swannell qualified as a chartered accountant and was later called to the bar.

Swannell worked in investment banking for 33 years with Schroders and Citigroup. During this time he was senior non-executive director at British Land and 3i and chairman of HMV from February 2009 to March 2011.

He was the chairman of Marks & Spencer from January 2011 until September 2017, when he was succeeded by Archie Norman.

At the Shareholder Executive, which oversees the UK government's financial interests in a range of state-owned enterprises, he was appointed as a non-executive director in late 2013 and as chair in September 2014. The body was merged into UK Government Investments in 2016, and he continued as chair of UKGI until 2021. During this time the Post Office scandal surrounding wrongful prosecutions was unfolding, and in 2014 Swannell told the public inquiry that the Post Office became UKGI's top priority in 2019, after a defeat in the High Court.

== Honours ==
In the 2018 New Year Honours he was appointed Commander of the British Empire (CBE) for services to the public, retail and financial sectors.
