= Robert Erskine (sculptor) =

Robert Erskine FRSS (born 1954) is an English sculptor. He has created many public sculptures by commission, which stand in locations in Britain and Europe.

== Life ==
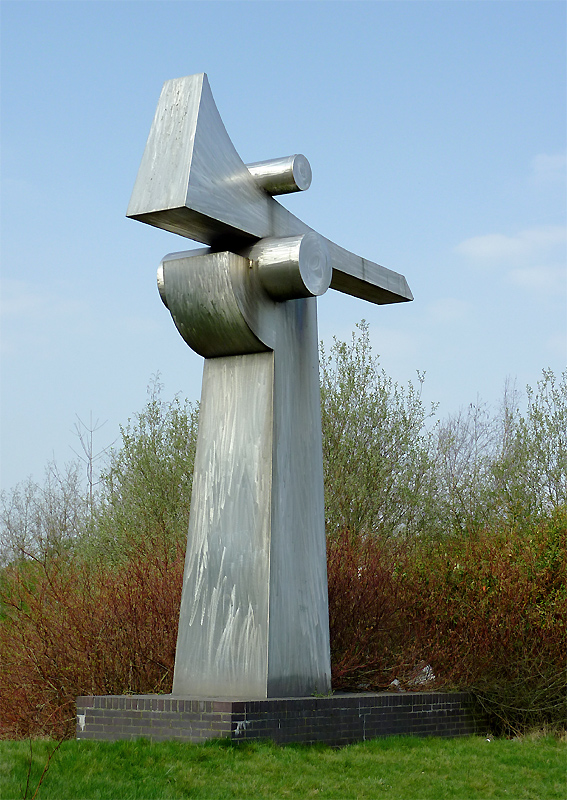
"Roll Down" (1994) in Bilston

Erskine was born in London. He studied sculpture at Kingston School of Art from 1971 to 1976, and completed postgraduate studies at Slade School of Fine Art under Reg Butler, gaining an MA in fine art sculpture in 1978. He has exhibited in Japan, Europe and the US as well as Great Britain. He worked from studios in London until 2014, more recently working from a studio at his home in Suffolk. He is a visiting lecturer in the UK and overseas.

Erskine became an Associate of the Royal Society of Sculptors in 1993, and a Fellow in 1996. He has described his passion for engineering, industry and nature as main influences for his work.

== Works ==
Erskine's works include the following:

"Quintisection", of 1993, is a stainless steel sculpture in Sunderland, Tyne and Wear, height 11.5 metres (38 ft), commissioned by Doxford International Business Park. It is based on a cross-section of a ship. It gained for Erskine in 1995 the award Best Sculpture Outside London from the Royal Society of Sculptors.

"Roll Down", in Spring Vale, Bilston, West Midlands, was commissioned by Blue Lamp Business Parks, and was unveiled by Dennis Turner in 1994. The stainless steel sculpture, height 10.5 metres (34 ft), represents an ingot passing through a rolling mill. It was nominated for the Anderson Sculpture Prize.

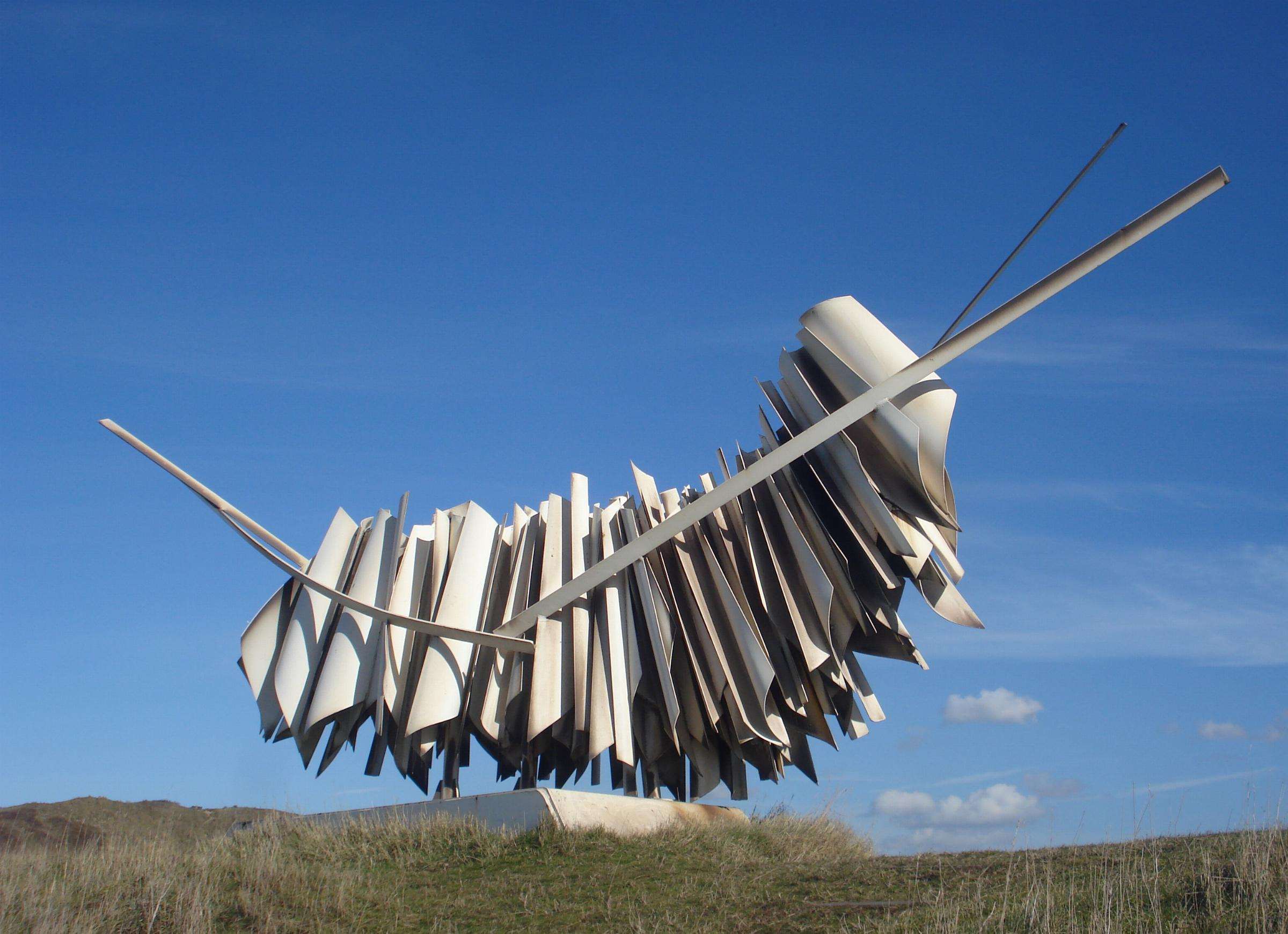
"White Rhythm" (2000) in Wijk aan Zee, the Netherlands

"White Rhythm" stands on a dune at Wijk aan Zee in the Netherlands. Erskine in 1999 represented Great Britain at the European Capital of Culture Sculpture Symposium "Sea and Steel", Britain being one of twelve countries hosted by the Netherlands. "White Rhythm" was awarded first prize by Queen Beatrix. The stainless steel sculpture measuring 8 by 12 metres (26 by 39 ft), installed in 2000, is made of shapes cut out of sheet metal, and is an abstract representation of a crowd of people moving in a busy street.

"Power Rhythm", installed in Peterborough, Cambridgeshire, in 2000, was commissioned by Peterborough Environment City Trust; Erskine won a national competition to create a sculpture for the city to celebrate the millennium. It is made of stainless steel and is 16 metres (52 ft) high. Apprentices from Perkins Engines and Midas Engineering took part in its fabrication.

The "Tunstall Shard", installed in 2008, is a stainless steel sculpture in Alexandra Retail Park in Tunstall, Staffordshire, commissioned by Dransfield Properties. It is a representation of a shard of Roman pottery, found during redevelopment of the former Wedgwood pottery site. The original shard, including a fingerprint, is magnified 300 times to a height of 10 metres (33 ft).
