= Patrick O'Sullivan (businessman) =

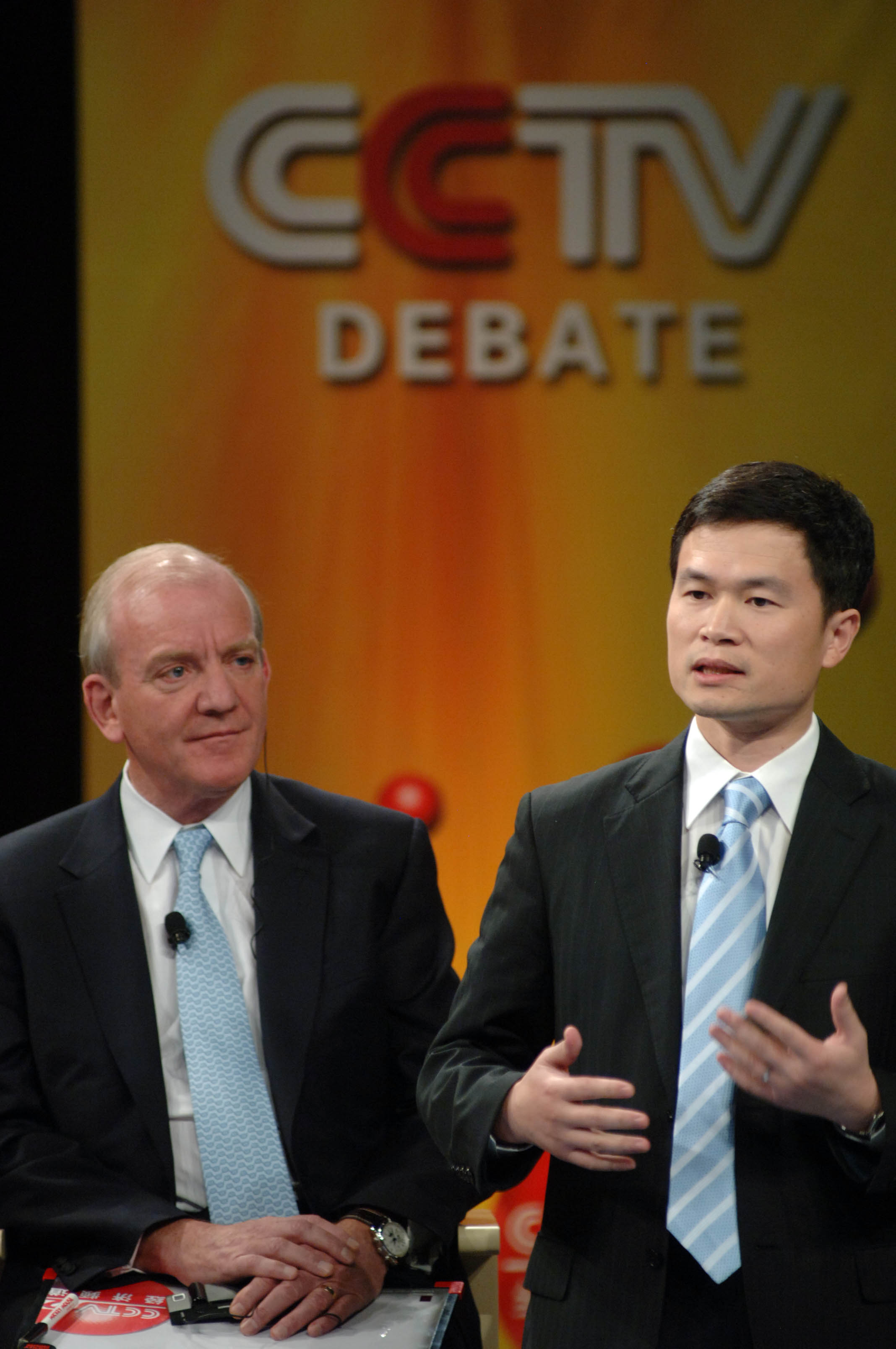
- O'Sullivan (left) in 2008
- Born: Patrick Henry Pierce O'Sullivan; April 1949 (age 77)
- Education: Trinity College, Dublin; London School of Economics
- Occupation: Business executive
- Board member of: Old Mutual; Man Group; Bank of Ireland; Saga plc

Patrick Henry Pierce O'Sullivan (born April 1949) is an Irish businessman and public servant, who had executive roles at Zurich Financial Services and went on to hold non-executive positions at Old Mutual, Bank of Ireland and Saga plc.

== Early life and education ==
O'Sullivan was born in April 1949. He has a bachelor's degree in business studies from Trinity College, Dublin, and a master's degree in accounting and finance from the London School of Economics (LSE). He is a fellow of the Institute of Chartered Accountants in Ireland.

== Career ==
Early in his career, he worked for financial institutions including Bank of America, Goldman Sachs and Barclays. He then spent 12 years at Zurich Financial Services Group, where his roles included CEO of Eagle Star, CEO of UK General Insurance, group chief financial officer, and (from 2007) vice-chair of the management board.

O'Sullivan took up non-executive director positions in 2007 at Man Group and Collins Stewart, and concentrated on non-executive roles after retiring from Zurich in 2009. He joined Bank of Ireland in 2009 and was appointed deputy governor there in 2011, working one day a week until 2015. He was chair of the Shareholder Executive, which oversees the UK government's financial interests in a range of state-owned enterprises, from March 2012 to September 2014, working two days a month.

He was chair of Old Mutual plc from January 2010 until he oversaw the break-up of the company in 2018, working four days a week. He was then chair of Saga plc from May 2018 to October 2020, where he was paid £325,000 per year.
