= Kura (company) =

Kura (CS) Ltd.
- Contact Centre Outsourcing Solutions

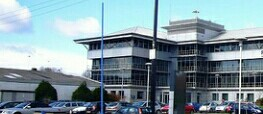
- Citypoint building
- Company type: Limited company
- Industry: Customer Management Solutions
- Founded: 2015
- Founder: Brian Bannatyne Executive Chairman
- Fate: Active
- Headquarters: Glasgow, Scotland, UK
- Number of locations: 1
- Area served: UK
- Key people: Owen Campbell CEO
- Products: Syntelate, Advisgo
- Owner: Owner managed
- Number of employees: <300
- Website: www.wearekura.com

Kura is a contact centre company based in Glasgow, Scotland. They provide outsourced contact centre services and software, including customer service, retention, win-back, up-sell, cross-sell, web chat, complaints handling, appointment setting, general customer management and software development.

== History ==
Kura currently operates with sites in Glasgow, Scotland and Sunderland, North East England. Kura announced on 28 June 2018 that they have expanded and acquired a business in Durban, South Africa.

== Accreditations ==
Kura are members of the National Outsourcing Association. Inisoft are a technology partner of telecom equipment provider, Avaya.
