= GlaxoSmithKline Services Unlimited v Commission =

Decision of the European Court of Justice

- The logo of GlaxoSmithKline
- Court: European Court of Justice
- Citations: (2009) C-513/06, [2006] ECR II-2969

Keywords
- Competition, collusion

GlaxoSmithKline Services Unlimited v Commission (2009) C-513/06 is an EU competition law case, concerning the meaning of harm to "competition" under TFEU article 101.

== Facts ==
GlaxoSmithKline put a clause in contracts with Spanish wholesalers requiring they did not export medicines to other Member States. National health authorities fix prices for medicines at different levels, and it wished to prevent wholesalers shipping cheap drugs from Spain to the UK. The Commission found that GSK's agreement had the object of restricting competition, given that the agreement served to partition the internal market. GSK appealed against the finding.

== Judgment ==
=== General Court ===
The General Court held that the prevention of parallel trade was not enough to amount to a restriction of competition. It said that the objective of article 101 is to stop ‘reducing the welfare of the final consumer of the products in question.' The Commission must not only find a reduction of parallel trade, but also say why this damages competition.

=== Court of Justice ===
The Court of Justice overturned the General Court, and held that prevention of parallel imports was unlawful. The General Court had committed an error of law by holding that some effect on consumers was necessary. The unlawfulness of this activity had been established in Consten and Grundig. The Court said the following.

63. [...] it must be borne in mind that the Court has held that, like other competition rules laid down in the Treaty, Article 85 aims to protect not only the interests of competitors or of consumers, but also the structure of the market and, in so doing, competition as such. Consequently, for a finding that an agreement has an anti-competitive object, it is not necessary that final consumers be deprived of the advantages of effective competition in terms of supply or price.

== See also ==
- EU competition law
