= Birchwood Park =

Business park in Cheshire, England

- Location within England
- Location: Warrington, United Kingdom
- Coordinates: 53.425994°N 2.525050°W
- No. of tenants: 150
- No. of workers: 5,000
- Website: www.birchwoodpark.co.uk

Birchwood Park is a business park in Birchwood near Warrington, United Kingdom.

== History ==
During World War II it was the site of Risley Royal Ordnance Factory. It was then used by the Admiralty as a storage depot until 1961, except for the north west section which was taken over by UKAEA in 1956.
