= Doxford International Business Park =

Business park in Sunderland, England

Coordinates: 54.864°N 1.435°W

Doxford International is a 125-acre (51 ha) business park located at the A19 / A690 interchange on the outskirts of Sunderland, in the North East of England. Previously it was a greenfield site, it was designated as an Enterprise Zone in 1990 in response to the decline of the area's former ship building and coal mining industries. A partnership between Sunderland City Council and Goodman Property (formerly Akeler Developments Ltd.) has seen the creation of 1,350,000 sq ft (125,000 m^{2}) of high-specification offices, with the private sector partner investing around £200 million. The first buildings were completed in 1992, providing accommodation for a range of businesses that have played a key role in the regeneration of the City.

At the entrance to the development stands the sculpture Quintisection by the sculptor Robert Erskine FRSS. Standing 26 ft in height (7.9 m) and 14.5 ft wide (4.4 m), it is made in wrought stainless steel, and is based upon a huge cross-section of an ocean liner. Commissioned by Doxford International Business Park, Quintesection is a sculpture to mark the shipbuilding industry of the North East.

The availability of telecommunications and a skilled workforce has been instrumental in the success of Doxford International, which is now a location for corporate HQs and contact centres serving the financial and customer service sectors. Around 8,000 people are now employed by a range of blue chip companies.

One business that located on Doxford International is mobile phone operator EE Limited, which has a customer support centre that now employs around 1,000 people. The site operates as a switching centre, underpinning the company's network between Leeds and Edinburgh.

Also on Doxford International, EDS has established a secure data centre. Citifinancial – part of the US-based CitiGroup – was one of the businesses that has reinvested in Doxford International, with an expansion project that brought additional jobs to Sunderland. CitiGroup no longer have a presence at Doxford, leaving the site in 2009.

EDF Energy has based its main contact centre at Doxford, originally trading at the site as London Electricity.

As well as small retail outlets such as Greggs the bakers and a Subway outlet, the Sunderland Health & Racquet Club operated by David Lloyd Leisure provides leisure facilities.

In 2002, the park won the Commercial Award, "for outstanding contribution from business and retail interests", at the 2002 Britain in Bloom Awards presentation ceremony in Aberdeen.

A 500-space car park was planned within the park in 2020.

In 2025, UK Management College submitted proposals for a site in Doxford International Business Park, to convert an empty office block so that it could offer courses in health and social care and fashion design.

== Businesses on Doxford International Business Park ==
=== Financial services ===
- Barclays PLC (UK, Banking)
- More Than (Royal & SunAlliance) (UK, Insurance)
- Computershare
- Fairstone

=== Contact centres ===
- Kura CS (Formally Parseq) (Outsource Contact Centre)
- EDF Energy plc (France, Customer Service Centre)
- Royal Mail (UK, Contact Centre)
- EE (UK, Contact Centre)
- ECO (UK, Contact Centre)

=== Head offices ===
- 4Projects (Local, Business Software)
- Arriva Ltd. (Local, Public Transport)
- Desco (Design & Consultancy) Ltd. (Local, Consulting Engineers)
- Gentoo Group (Local, Property Development)
- Wilcomm Homes (Local, House Builder)
- Melonite UK Ltd (Local, Telecommunications and Data)

=== Other companies ===
- Kinaxia Logistics
- Former EDS (Electronic Data Systems) now HP Enterprise Services UK Ltd (US, Secure Data Centre)
- Manitowoc Cranes Group (US, Mobile Cranes)
- Northern Gas Networks Ltd. (UK, Customer Service Centre)

=== Former companies ===
- Bowmer & Kirkland (UK, Contractor) - Moved in 2011 to Rainton Bridge Business Park.
