= Bradford & Bingley =

British building society and bank, 1964–2010

Coordinates: 53.847°N 1.838°W

Bradford & Bingley plc

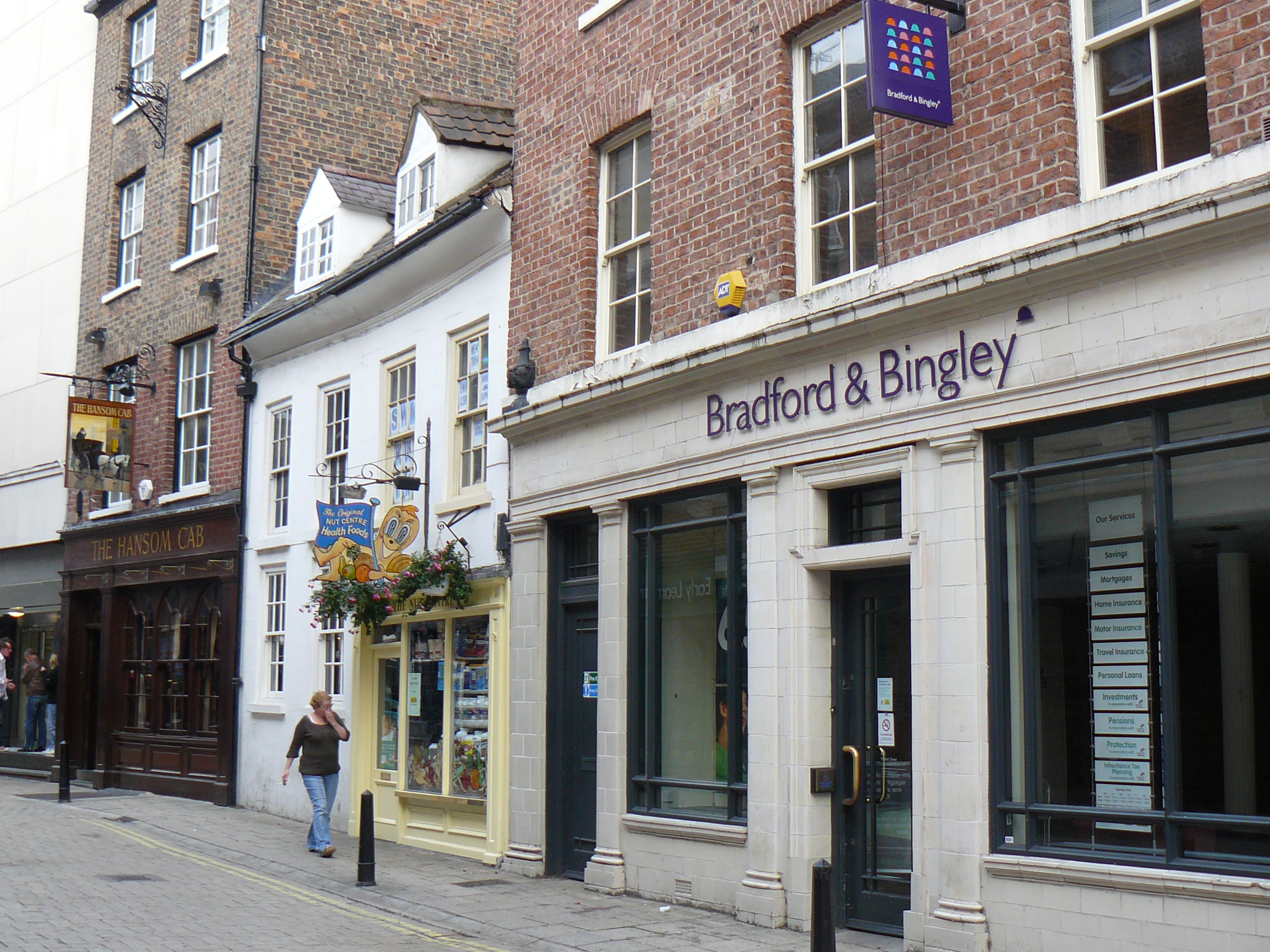
- A Bradford & Bingley branch in York, North Yorkshire, 2007
- Type: Public
- Industry: Finance
- Founded: 1964
- Defunct: 2010
- Fate: Nationalised in 2010. Its mortgages assets remained with Bradford & Bingley. Its deposits and branch network were sold to Abbey National plc, which was eventually renamed Santander UK plc.
- Headquarters: Bingley, West Yorkshire, United Kingdom
- Key people: Richard Pym (Former Executive Chairman)
- Products: Financial services
- Operating income: £572.3m (2007)
- Net income: £93.2m (2007)
- Number of employees: 2,862 (FTE in 2007)
- Parent: Davidson Kempner
- Website: www.bbg.co.uk

Bradford & Bingley plc was a British bank with headquarters in the West Yorkshire town of Bingley.

The bank was formed in December 2000 by demutualisation of the Bradford & Bingley Building Society following a vote of the building society's members, who swapped their nominal share of the building society for at least 250 shares of the newly formed bank.

In 2008, partly due to the subprime mortgage crisis, the bank was nationalised and in effect split into two parts; the mortgage book and investment portfolios remained with the now publicly owned Bradford & Bingley plc, and the deposits and branch network (and a licence to use the B&B name for those aspects) was sold to Abbey National, itself owned by the Spanish Santander Group. The branch network was rebranded Santander on 11 January 2010 and the Bradford & Bingley name mainly relates to the nationalised section of the bank. From 2010, the brand has been used under licence for insurance products by BGL Group.

== History ==
=== Formation ===
The Bradford & Bingley Building Society was the product of a merger between the Bradford Equitable Building Society (Bradford EBS) and the Bingley Building Society (Bingley BS) in 1964. There had been a move towards consolidation in the industry which had as many as 681 societies. In 1963 Bingley made the approach and the merger was effected with the understanding that there would be complete parity of control. Although Bingley BS had the larger number of branches (29 v 23) it was smaller by assets compared to the Bradford EBS (£43m v £56m). The Head Office was to be at Bingley; Bradford EBS had the President and Bingley BS the Vice President; and there were Joint Managing Directors. The new Society ranked number eight in the industry.

=== Sustained Growth ===
The period between the formation of the Bradford & Bingley Building Society and the conversion to a public company in 2000 saw sustained and substantial growth. Financial growth was aided by inflation, particularly in house prices, but the increase in members was from 164,000 in 1964 to 1.85m in 1988.

As well as organic development through the opening of new branches there were 24 acquisitions of other building societies between 1967 and 1987. The Hearts of Oak Society in 1982 was of particular benefit as it brought in 28 branches, mainly in the south-east. By 1988 the number of branches had increased from the 52 post-merger to around 250. Despite all this, the Society was still only number eight in the industry – a reflection of the amalgamations that were taking place elsewhere.

In May 1997 the society bought Mortgage Express from Lloyds TSB for £64 million.

In December 2000, following a vote by members, the society demutualised and floated on the London Stock Exchange.

=== 2008 Financial Crisis ===
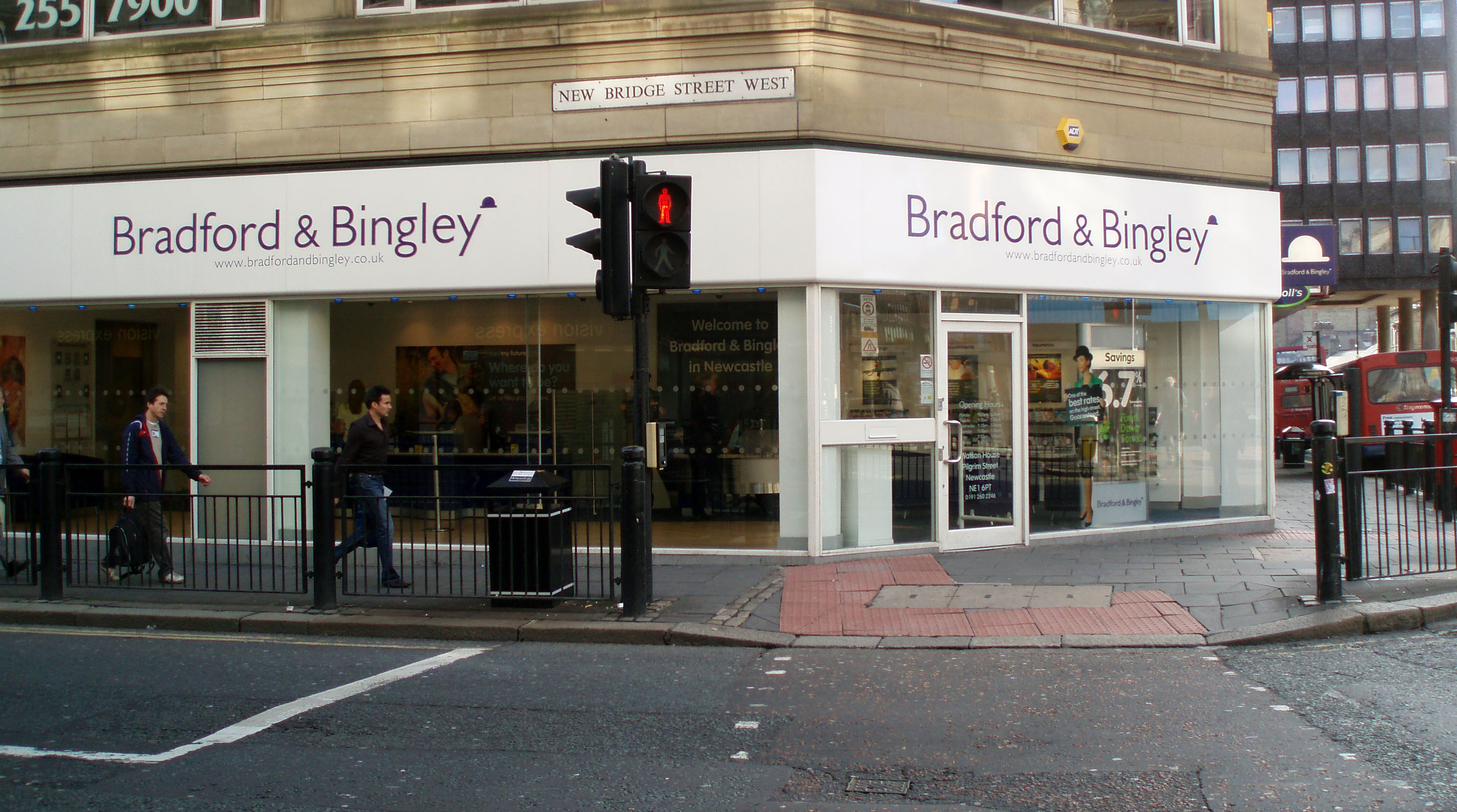
A branch of the bank in Newcastle upon Tyne in October 2008

B&B had chosen to specialise in buy-to-let and self-certification mortgages – its strategy left it exposed to the subprime mortgage crisis.

In response to the 2008 financial crisis in June 2008 the company launched a £400 million rights issue. This was not well subscribed by shareholders, leaving much of issue with underwriters. The issue had not been helped when TPG Capital, who had previously agreed to take a 23% stake in the company, withdrew their support.

Due to the effects of the credit crunch, in September 2008 the company's share price dropped to a record low. On 25 September 2008 they announced that 370 jobs were to go. The bank had also been seeking options from the Financial Services Authority (FSA) and the government to secure the future of the company, including selling the company to another bank or nationalisation. With Bradford & Bingley being nationalised, the structure was already in place from the legislation involved in the nationalisation of the Northern Rock bank in February (see Banking (Special Provisions) Act 2008 and Nationalisation of Northern Rock). The European regulators approved the government's rescue plan for Bradford & Bingley after just 24 hours.

=== Part nationalisation and sale of the savings book & branch network to Abbey National ===
There were reports from various sources that Bradford & Bingley was to be nationalised in its entirety, because a suitable buyer could not be found. With the structure already in place form the legislation involved in the nationalisation of the Northern Rock bank in February 2008 (see Banking (Special Provisions) Act 2008 and Nationalisation of Northern Rock, Bradford & Bingley was nationalised on 29 September 2008.

On 29 September 2008 it was also announced that the Spanish Santander Group under its Abbey National brand would acquire all of Bradford & Bingley's £20 billion (2.7 million customers) savings business and branch network. Santander paid £612 million, including the transfer of £208 million of capital relating to offshore companies. Bradford & Bingley's 197 retail branches, 141 agencies and related employees were transferred to Santander's subsidiary Abbey. The mortgage book, personal loan book, headquarters, treasury assets and its wholesale liabilities were taken into public ownership and closed to new business.In November 2008, the government set up a new company, UK Financial Investments (UKFI), to manage the shareholdings in Northern Rock and Bradford & Bingley.

=== Bradford & Bingley Shares ===
When the shares closed on 26 September they were worth 20 pence each, valuing the bank at £256 million, substantially less than Santander paid for it. In March 2006 the bank had been valued at £3.2 billion.

Bradford & Bingley's shareholders were not reimbursed for their shares which the government had taken over. Over 300 shareholders complained to the UK Shareholders Association that they had not received information relating to the fate of their holdings. Peter Clokey of PricewaterhouseCoopers was appointed by the government in June 2009 to act as independent valuer of the business, and it was reported that shareholders would be told how much compensation they were entitled to by June 2010.

Clokey's assessment was published on 5 July 2010, finding that shareholders were not entitled to any compensation. The decision was appealed to the Upper Tribunal's Tax and Chancery Chamber where on 19 July 2012, Judge Sir Stephen Oliver recorded that the court was satisfied that the valuer had carried out his duties wholly in accordance with the compensation scheme.

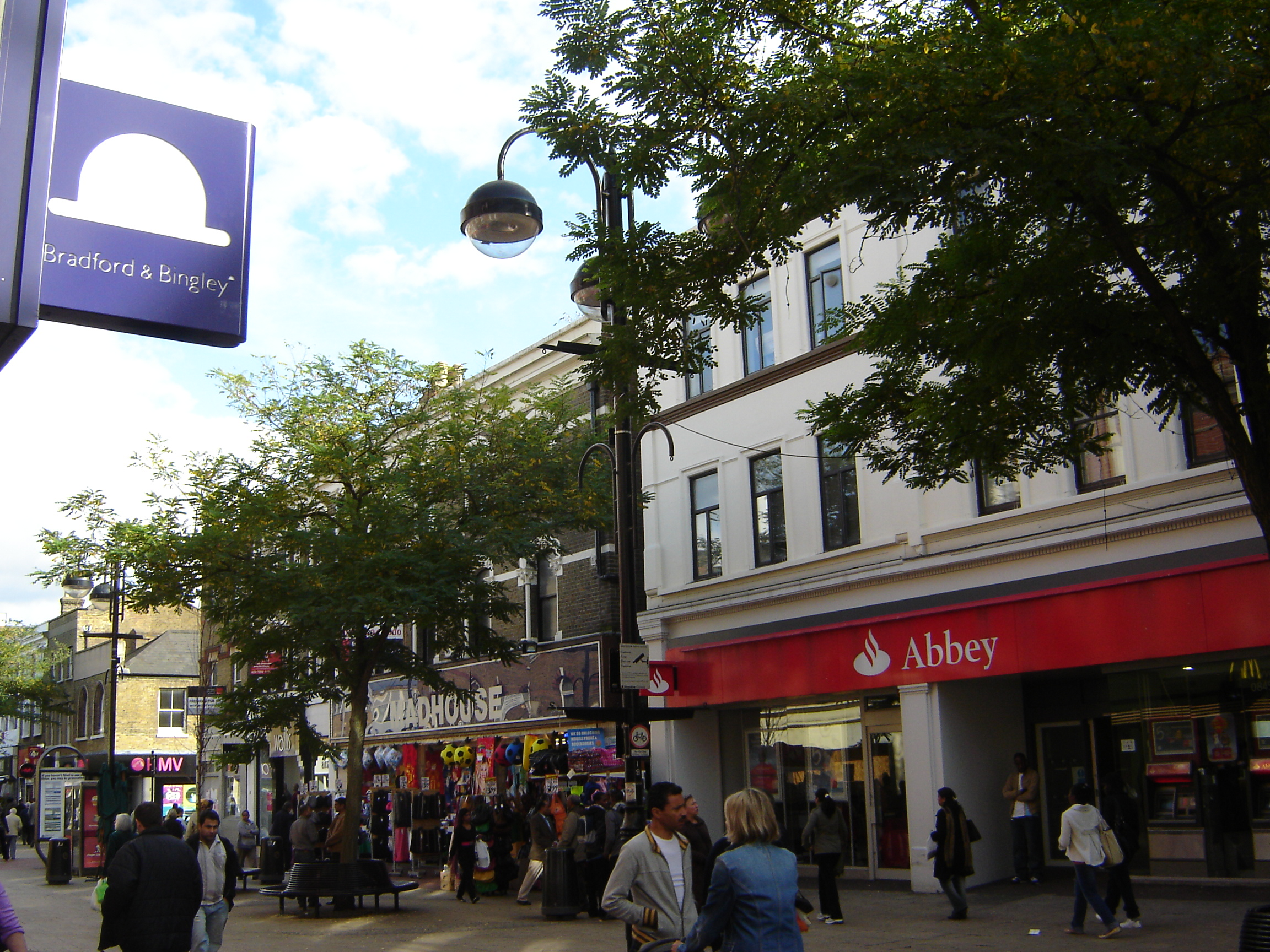
Neighbouring Bradford & Bingley and Abbey branches on Hounslow High Street, both have subsequently been rebranded as Santander

=== Post Nationalisation ===
In April 2009, the Financial Times reported that Bradford & Bingley may sell assets such as its commercial loan book, to assist in the running down its £42.2 billion loan book over the next ten years. In October, the Telegraph reported that the mortgage part of Bradford and Bingley would be mirroring the decision by Northern Rock to split their assets into good and bad assets, to attempt to pay off its £18.4 billion loan early.

On 11 January 2010, the combined business of Abbey and the Bradford & Bingley branch network was renamed Santander UK, and all branches were rebranded at a cost of £12 million. Alliance & Leicester was rebranded at the end of November 2010.

On 25 January 2010, the European Commission approved the state aid given to the bank. On 24 March 2010 UKFI announced the merger of the mortgage business with the bad bank of Northern Rock, Northern Rock (Asset Management) plc. The two businesses were merged under a single holding company, UK Asset Resolution, on 1 October 2010.

=== Transfer of ownership to Davidson Kempner and Hyalite Mortgages ===
On 29 October 2021, ownership of Bradford and Bingley was transferred from UK Asset Resolution to Davidson Kempner Capital Management, returning the company to private ownership.

On 23 October 2023, Bradford and Bingley, and Mortgage Express ceased to operate with all remaining accounts transferred to Hyalite Mortgages, a division of Topaz Finance Limited.

== Operations ==
=== Retail ===
Bradford & Bingley distributed brand-name and third party financial products. As at 31 December 2007 they had 197 branches and 140 third party agent locations offering retail products and face to face advice in addition to online and intermediary distribution.

Bradford & Bingley's approach to mortgage advising was innovative as they advised on and sold other providers mortgages as well as their own from 2000 to 2006. In late 2006, as part of their aim to become the UK's leading specialist lender, Bradford & Bingley reverted to selling only their own mortgages under the Bradford & Bingley and Mortgage Express brands. In addition, Bradford & Bingley acquired mortgages from GMAC-RFC and Kensington Mortgage Group Ltd; this accounted for 44% of gross residential advances during 2007.

=== Lending ===
Bradford & Bingley had its own lending products including mortgage and commercial real estate products. Bradford & Bingley also provided loan quotes through Compare the Loan for those who did not have a Bradford & Bingley branch locally.

Bradford & Bingley had developed Mortgage Express into a 'niche' lending brand dealing with specialist lending with more complicated underwriting requirements such as buy-to-let and self-certification mortgages. Mortgage Express is also closed to new business, following Bradford & Bingley's nationalisation.

== Corporate affairs ==
=== Headquarters ===
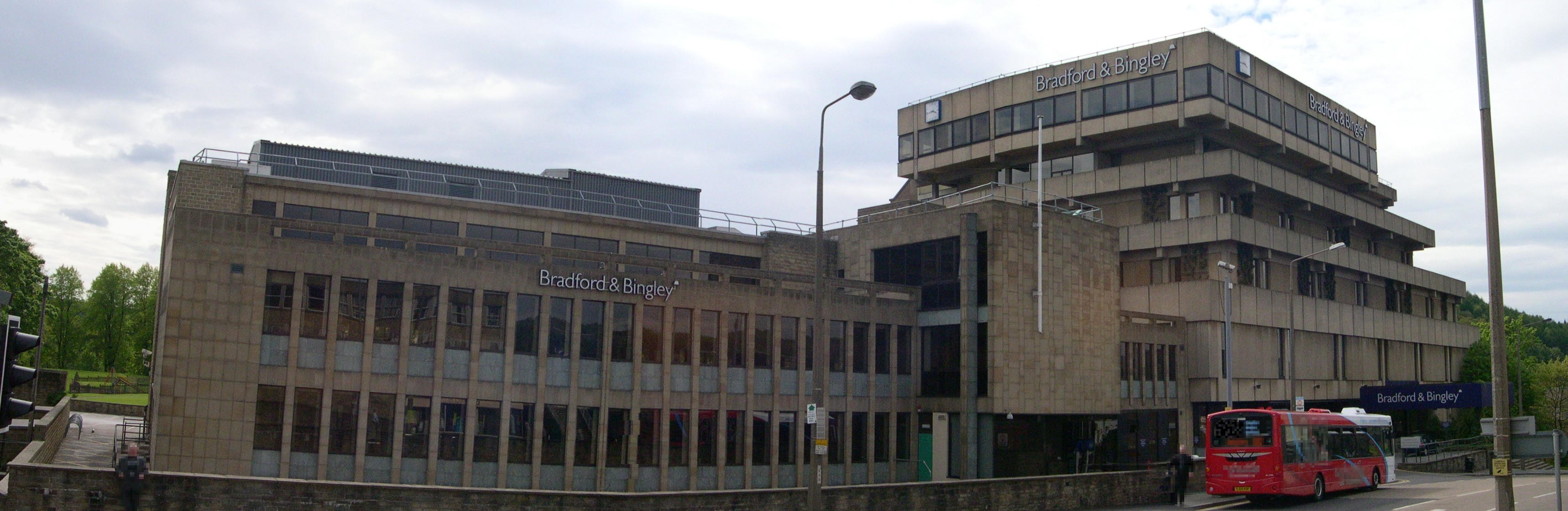
Bradford & Bingley's former headquarters building, Main Street, Bingley

Bradford & Bingley's former headquarters were on Main Street in Bingley. A new office in Crossflatts in Bingley was built in 2004, which became the new company headquarters. Following Santander's purchase of the savings business, it was confirmed in May 2009 that remaining Bradford & Bingley staff would transfer to the company's head office in Crossflatts, and that the Bingley building would be sold or sub-let.

Sainsbury's bought the building in 2010 and unveiled plans to redevelop it as a supermarket. Planning permission for a new supermarket was granted in September 2011, but in April 2012, Sainsbury's admitted that building work would not begin for another 12 months. In November 2013 the company revealed it would not go ahead with a new supermarket, but would instead demolish the building and sell the site. Demolition work was delayed by the discovery of roosting bats and asbestos, but began in January 2015. On 12 January 2017, it was confirmed that Sainsbury's had sold the site to rival supermarket company Lidl.

=== Trademarks ===
During the nationalisation process, it was mentioned that the bank had registered more than 100 separate trademarks including the bowler hat, its long-running logo. The bank had also purchased a bowler hat in 1995 which had formerly belonged to Stan Laurel, for £2,000.

== Sponsorship ==
Bradford & Bingley were previously sponsors of Yorkshire County Cricket Club, Bradford & Bingley RFC (formerly Bingley Bees), and team sponsor of Bradford City A.F.C. Valley Parade stadium had previously been known as Bradford & Bingley Stadium through sponsorship rights.

== See also ==
- Union for Bradford and Bingley Staff and Associated Companies
