= Regent Centre =

Coordinates: 55.0117°N 1.624°W

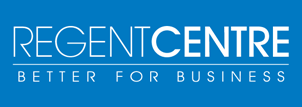
Regent Centre logo

Regent Centre is a large business park and residential complex in Gosforth, Newcastle upon Tyne, England. The business park is home to a variety of companies, including Nationwide Building Society whose predecessors Virgin Money and Northern Rock had their head office on the site. The centre has its own transport interchange with a station on the Tyne & Wear Metro and integrated bus station.

== History ==
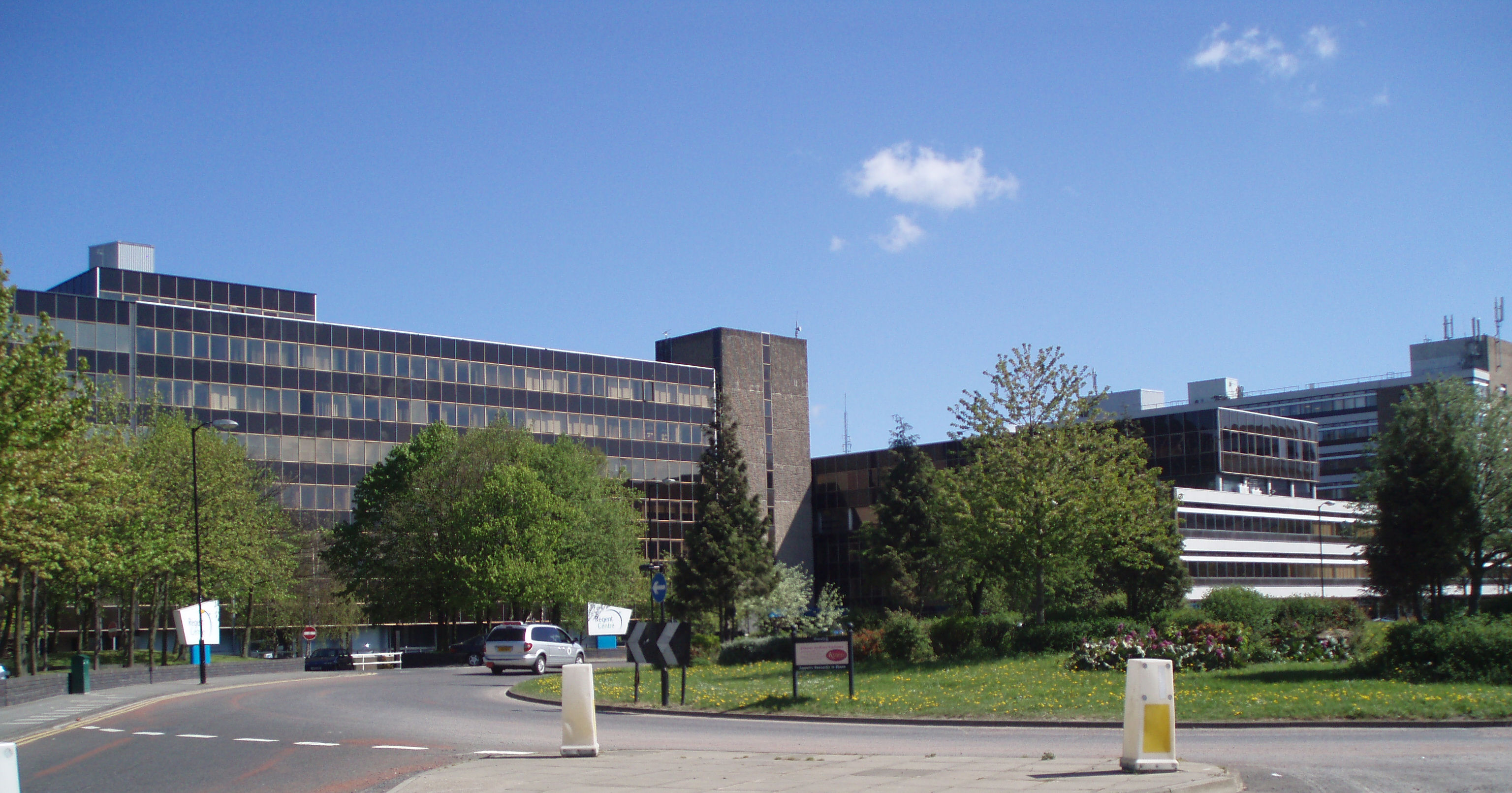
Some of the Regent Centre buildings

North British Properties started to build Regent Centre in 1970 and finished in 1981; at completion it was the largest office complex in Europe, covering a total area of 11 acres (4.5 ha). The land is the former site of the Regent Pit of the Coxlodge Colliery. The centre unveiled a new logo and identity in late 2008; the centre's slogan is "Better for Business".

The current owner-developer is Omnia Offices who bought the complex in 2015 and are converting some of the office space into residential apartments. The previous owner was Kennedy Wilson Europe Real Estate who purchased it along with the rest of the Fordgate Group's Jupiter Portfolio in June 2014.

== Occupants ==
Nationwide Building Society and LNER have offices in the Regent Centre. Former tenants of the Regent Centre are HM Revenue & Customs as well as the Driver & Vehicle Licensing Agency, Health & Safety Executive and the Labour Party. In addition, The Sage Group, Northern Engineering Industries, Cundall and AMEC all had offices at the Regent Centre. The Newcastle regional centre for the Open University was housed here, although it was relocated to Gateshead in 2009.

There is also a hair salon/coffee shop as well as a gym and physiotherapy specialist. Previously there had been a branch of Barclays Bank located in the Regent Centre buildings.

== Location ==
Within walking distance of Regent Centre, there is Regent Centre Interchange, Gosforth Academy, Gosforth Library and Customer Service Centre, and the Gosforth Leisure Centre which comprises several amenities including swimming pools and gym. There is also an Asda superstore close by, which in mid 2007 had an extension built which houses a restaurant. Across from Asda there is a Marks & Spencer food store; that site used to house a furniture store, and had previously been a Jaguar Cars showroom. Gosforth High Street is also within a few minutes' walk. St Charles' Primary school is located on Regent Farm Road, across from the Virgin Money buildings, between Regent Centre and a housing estate, Regent Farm Estate.

== Regent Point ==
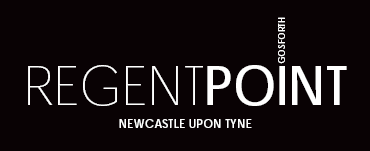
Regent Point logo

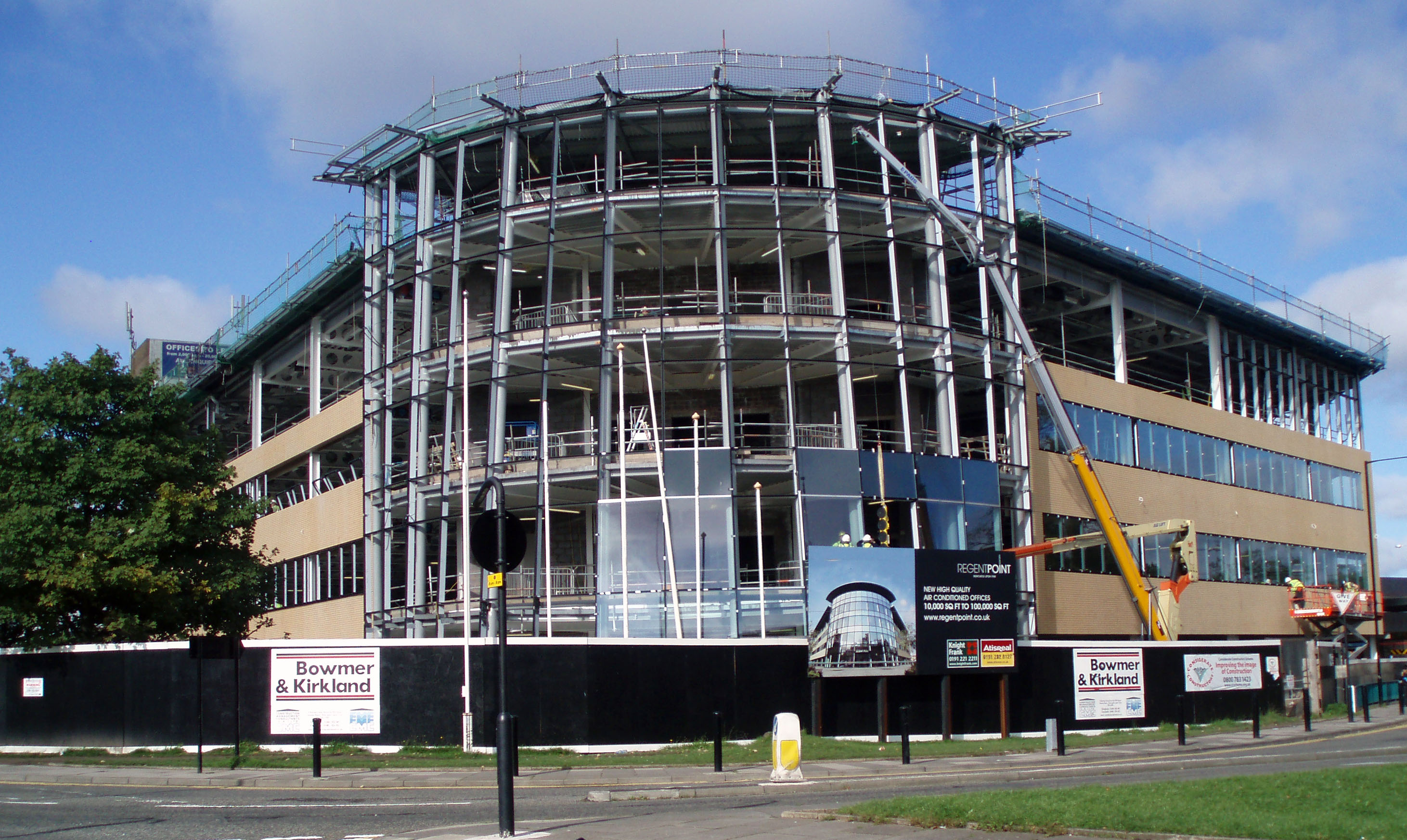
Regent Point during construction in October 2008

Planning applications were granted to expand and modernise a large section of the Regent Centre site, which is adjacent to the Metro line. In April 2007, work began on this area of land which is also called Regent Point; building work began in early 2008 on the 100,000 sq ft (9,300 m^{2}) building. It is a four-storey office building with a glazed corner tower and modelled to be similar to the existing Regent Centre buildings.

Clayton House, which occupied the Regent Point plot, was demolished in 1999 and so the plot was vacant for many years. There have been many different accepted plans for this site, including plans for a 5-storey building in 1998. In 2004 there were plans for a 7-storey building with retail space on the ground floor, however, these plans were withdrawn in July 2005.

Developer Fordgate Group appointed Bowmer & Kirkland as the main contractor for Regent Point. The architects were Howarth Litchfield Partnership, the consulting engineers were Cundall, and Home Stretch Properties Ltd. were also involved in the project. Caunton Engineering Ltd supplied and erected over 600 tonnes of beam and column structural steelwork. The building has a BREEAM rating of "Excellent".

In November 2013, Regent Point was purchased by the Newcastle upon Tyne Hospitals NHS Trust, represented by GVA, for an undisclosed sum.

== Nationwide Building Society ==
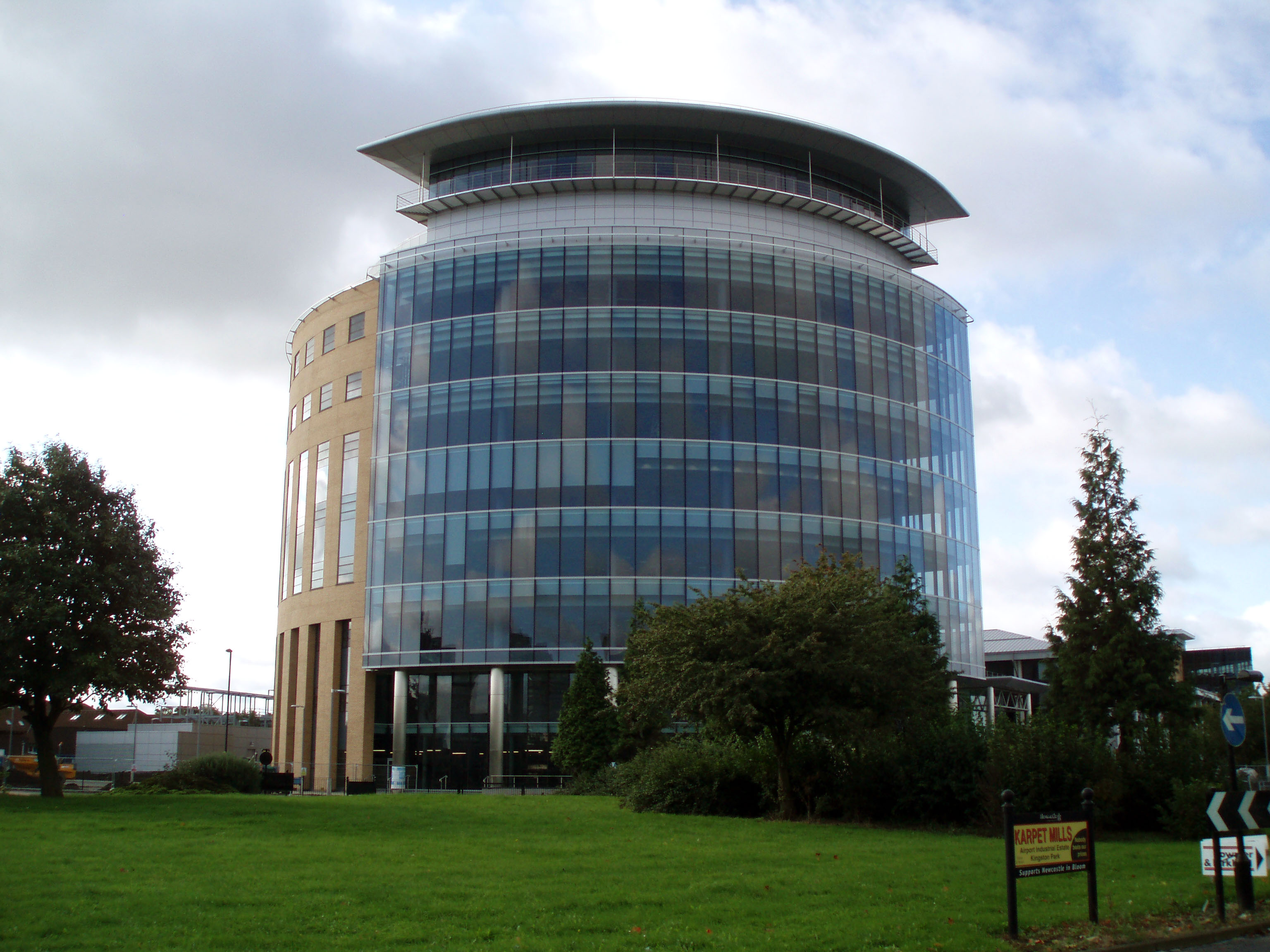
During the final stages of construction of the Partnership House building (October 2008).

Nationwide Building Society's Virgin Money brand has its headquarters in Jubilee House which is adjacent to, although not part of, Regent Centre. The Red Box Design Group were involved with the development of all of the (currently standing) buildings for the bank.

The focal point of Regent Centre since 1965 had been Northern Rock's old 7-storey building. In early 2006 this building was demolished and its replacement, known as Partnership House, which is 10 storeys high and cost £35 million, was completed in November 2008. Two of Northern Rock's other buildings on the site were completed in the 1990s; two further buildings were built in the early 2000s. The 1960s tower building also housed a branch of the Northern Rock bank.

Northern Rock had financial difficulties in 2007 due to the subprime mortgage crisis and was nationalised in 2008. This led to the company deciding to downsize, including job cuts and deciding to put this new tower building up for let or sale. Newcastle City Council spent £22 million purchasing the building, and let it out to another firm, a company set up by the council with support services firm Carillion, on a 25-year lease. After Carillion's collapse in 2017, law firm Clifford Chance acquired the lease on Partnership House.

In November 2011 Virgin Money agreed to purchase Northern Rock from the British Government. The deal was finalised on 1 January 2012. As of 12 October 2012 Northern Rock was rebranded to Virgin Money, and these buildings became Virgin Money's headquarters for their savings and mortgages business. Northern Rock House was renamed Jubilee House as part of the rebranding exercise. Nationwide acquired Virgin Money including its Clydesdale Bank operating subsidiary in October 2024.

== Buildings ==
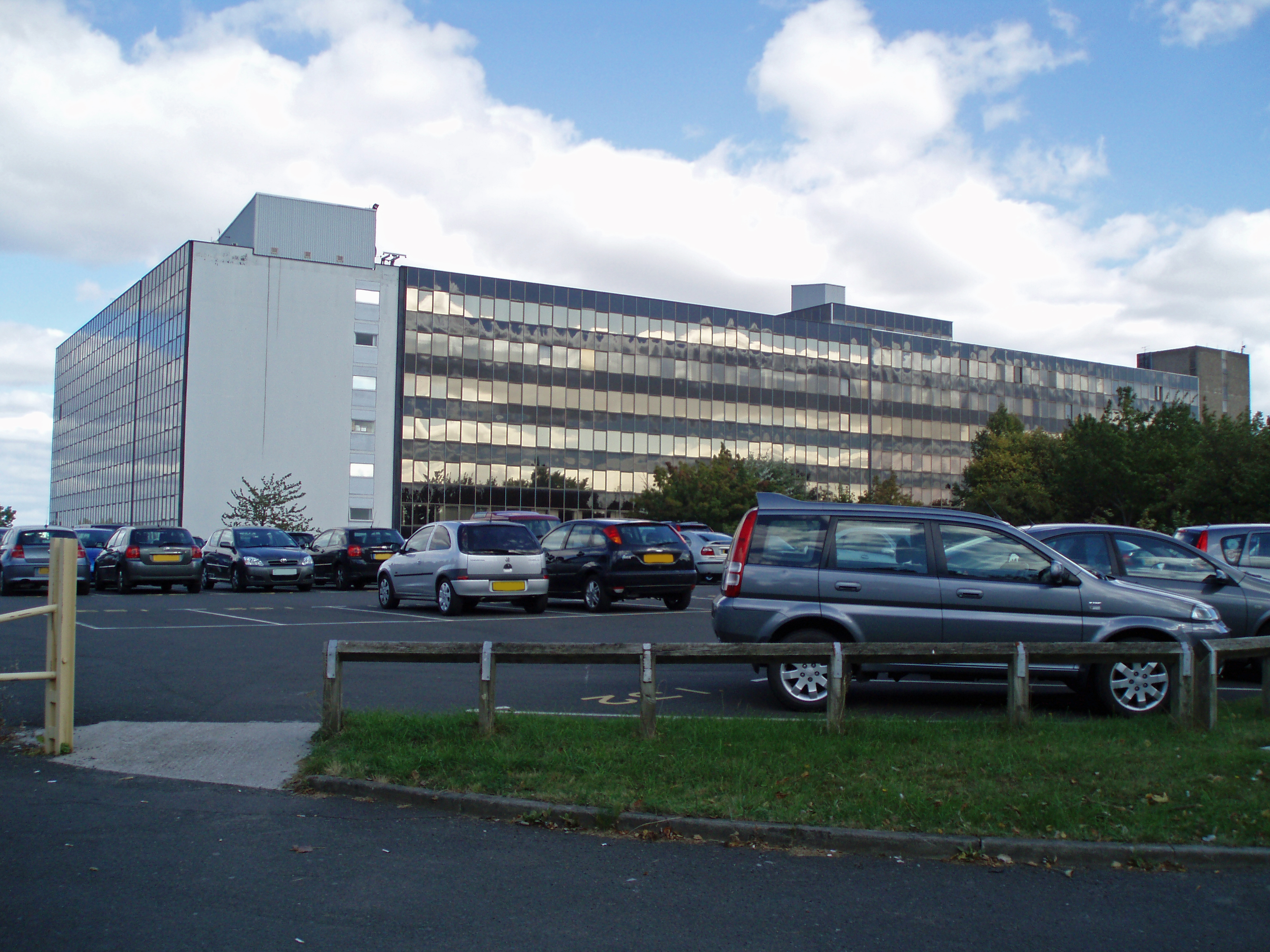
One of the Regent Centre buildings

With the new developments, as of March 2009, there is empty office space to let. There is space available in Regent Point, Horsley House North, Dobson House and Eldon House West. The buildings are named after well known local industrialists and architects, such as John Dobson and Lord Eldon.

Buildings

- Arden House
- Bulman House
- Horsley House North
- Horsley House
- Eldon House West
- Northumbria House
- Dobson House
- Eldon House East
- Regent Point

The Grainger Suite is located in Dobson House. North East accountancy firm MHA Tait Walker has offices in Bulman House.

In 2015 the owners of the north side of Regent Centre were exploring possibilities for the business park's future, including potentially turning the buildings into 400 residential dwellings, work that was under way in 2018.
