= UK Financial Investments =

Government financial services holding company

UK Financial Investments Limited
- Company type: Private limited company
- Industry: Financial
- Founded: 3 November 2008
- Defunct: 31 March 2018
- Successor: UK Government Investments
- Headquarters: 100 Parliament Street, London, SW1A 2BQ
- Key people: James Leigh-Pemberton (Chairman); Oliver Holbourn (Chief Executive Officer)
- Services: Managed investments in: Lloyds Banking Group (43.4%); Royal Bank of Scotland Group (84.4%); UK Asset Resolution (100%)
- Owner: HM Treasury
- Website: www.ukfi.co.uk

UK Financial Investments (UKFI) was a limited company set up in November 2008 and mandated by the UK government to manage HM Treasury's shareholdings in Lloyds Banking Group, the Royal Bank of Scotland Group and UK Asset Resolution. UKFI ceased trading in March 2018, and its business and assets were transferred to UK Government Investments.

== History ==
On 3 November 2008, UKFI was established as part of the UK government's response to the financial crisis. Its role was to manage HM Treasury's shareholdings in Lloyds Banking Group, the Royal Bank of Scotland Group (RBS) and UK Asset Resolution (UKAR), and to return ownership of the banks to the private sector over time.

In 2015 UKFI and the Shareholder Executive became subsidiaries of UK Government Investments (UKGI) and in April 2016 both were merged. The disposal of Lloyds shares was completed in May 2017. UKFI ceased trading on 31 March 2018, and management of the remaining shareholdings in RBS and UKAR were transferred to UKGI, a limited company wholly owned by HM Treasury.

=== Lloyds Banking Group ===
HM Treasury's shareholdings in Lloyds Banking Group dropped from 43% to 41% in February 2010 after it issued 3.14 billion new shares, and dropped again in 2013 from 39% to 33% after it sold £3.2 billion worth of shares. A trading plan of incremental sales during 2015 reduced the stake to below 10% by the end of October. Sales resumed in November 2016, as the holding was reduced to 7.99%. By mid March 2017 the holding was 2.95%, and by late April 2017 it was just 0.89%. On 17 May 2017, the government confirmed that all its shares in Lloyds had been sold.

=== Royal Bank of Scotland Group ===
On 3 November 2009, the government injected further capital into Royal Bank of Scotland Group (RBS), which resulted in HM Treasury's shareholdings in the company rising from 70% to 83%. The proportion of the shareholding fell slightly to 80% by the end of March 2014, because of new issues of shares to other shareholders during the previous few years. The government's stake had further decreased to 78.3% by August 2015. That month, UKFI disposed of 5.4% of their shareholding in RBS. In April 2020 the shareholding was 62% and later that year the company was rebranded as NatWest Group. On 30 May 2025, the government sold the last of its shares in NatWest.

=== UK Asset Resolution ===
UK Asset Resolution (UKAR) held the residual assets of Northern Rock and Bradford & Bingley. On 1 January 2012, Northern Rock was sold to Virgin Money. The residual mortgage assets of NRAM and Bradford & Bingley were gradually sold off in tranches, with the final sales completed on 29 October 2021.

== See also ==
- 2008 United Kingdom bank rescue package
- 2008 Liechtenstein tax affair
