= Education Business Partnership =

Education Business Partnerships (EBPs) were, until 2011, UK-government-sponsored bodies. In 2011, the Department for Education (DfE) abolished funding for Education Business Links. EBPs now directly contract with schools to provide Work Experience, Work Related Learning, Enterprise Education and Careers Education, and Information and Guidance (CEIAG) by linking the worlds of business and education to offer young people a rewarding and realistic introduction to work. Around two-thirds of secondary schools nationally have decided to maintain a work experience offer.

EBPs are regionally based and supported by a national network organisation, the Education Business Partnership Network.

== Statutory status ==
EBPs do not have a statutory status, although many support schools and local authorities with the delivery of statutory programmes.

== Funding ==
In March 2011, the Young People's Learning Agency stated that the Department for Education, successor to the DCSF, had confirmed that funding for Education Business Partnership Services had been withdrawn with effect from 31 March 2011, and that schools would decide whether to buy in their services locally.
