= List of companies of the Isle of Man =

Location of Isle of Man

The Isle of Man is a self-governing crown dependency in the Irish Sea between England and Northern Ireland. The head of state is King Charles III, who holds the title of Lord of Mann. The Lord of Mann is represented by a lieutenant governor. Foreign relations and defence are the responsibility of the British Government.

The Isle of Man is a low-tax economy with no capital gains tax, wealth tax, stamp duty, or inheritance tax and a top rate of income tax of 22%. The rate of corporation tax is 0% for almost all types of income; the only exceptions are that the profits of banks are taxed at 10%, as is rental (or other) income from land and buildings situated on the Isle of Man.

Offshore banking, manufacturing, and tourism form key sectors of the economy. Agriculture and fishing, once the mainstays of the economy, now make declining contributions to the island's Gross Domestic Product (GDP).

== Notable firms ==
This list includes notable companies with primary headquarters located in the country. The industry and sector follow the Industry Classification Benchmark taxonomy. Organizations which have ceased operations are included and noted as defunct.

Notable companies Status: P=Private, S=State; A=Active, D=Defunct
Name	Industry	Sector	Headquarters	Founded	Notes	Status	
Alliance & Leicester International	Financials	Banks	Douglas	1990	Bank, defunct 2013	P	D
Bradford & Bingley International	Financials	Banks	Douglas	1989	Financial services, defunct 2011	P	D
Celton Manx	Consumer services	Gambling	Douglas	2009	Gambling	P	A
EuroManx	Consumer services	Airlines	Ronaldsway	2002	Airline, defunct 2008	P	D
Excalibur Almaz	Industrials	Aerospace	Douglas	2005	Spaceflight	P	A
Isle of Man Air Services	Consumer services	Airlines	Ronaldsway	1937	Airline, nationalized 1947	P	D
Isle of Man Bank	Financials	Banks	Douglas	1865	Bank	P	A
Isle of Man Post	Industrials	Delivery services	Douglas	1973	Postal services	S	A
Isle of Man Steam Packet Company	Consumer services	Travel & tourism	Douglas	1830	Ferry	P	A
Manx Airlines	Consumer services	Airlines	Ballasalla	1982	Airline, defunct 2002	P	D
Manx Telecom	Telecommunications	Fixed line telecommunications	Braddan	1987	Broadband	P	A
Manx2	Consumer services	Airlines	Ballasalla	2006	Airline, defunct 2012	P	D
Nationwide International	Financials	Banks	Douglas	1990	Offshore savings	P	A
Neteller	Financials	Specialty finance	Douglas	1999	Payments	P	A
Okells Brewery	Consumer goods	Brewers	Douglas	1850	Brewery, pubs	P	A
Paysafe Group	Financials	Specialty finance	Douglas	1996	Payments	P	A
Peel Engineering Company	Consumer goods	Automobiles	Peel	?	Defunct 1974	P	D
PokerStars	Consumer services	Gambling	Douglas	2001	Gambling	P	A
Sea Breezes	Consumer services	Publishing	Douglas	1919	Publisher	P	A
Simcocks Advocates	Industrials	Business support services	Douglas	1949	Legal	P	A

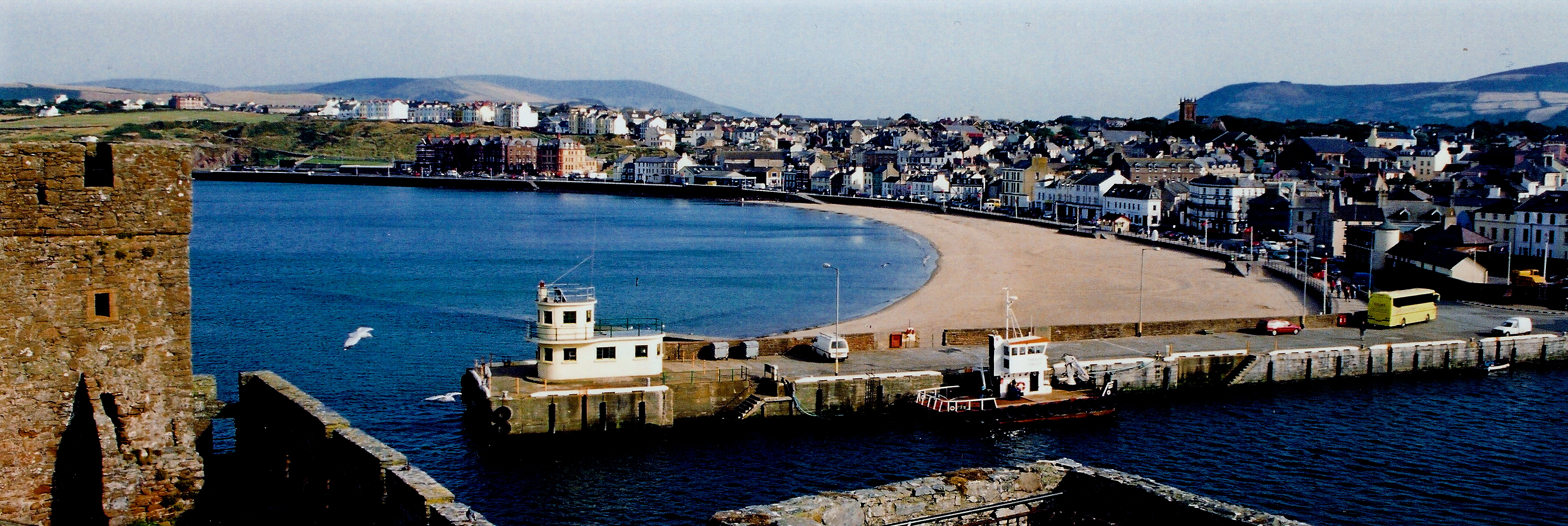
Peel is the island's main fishing port.

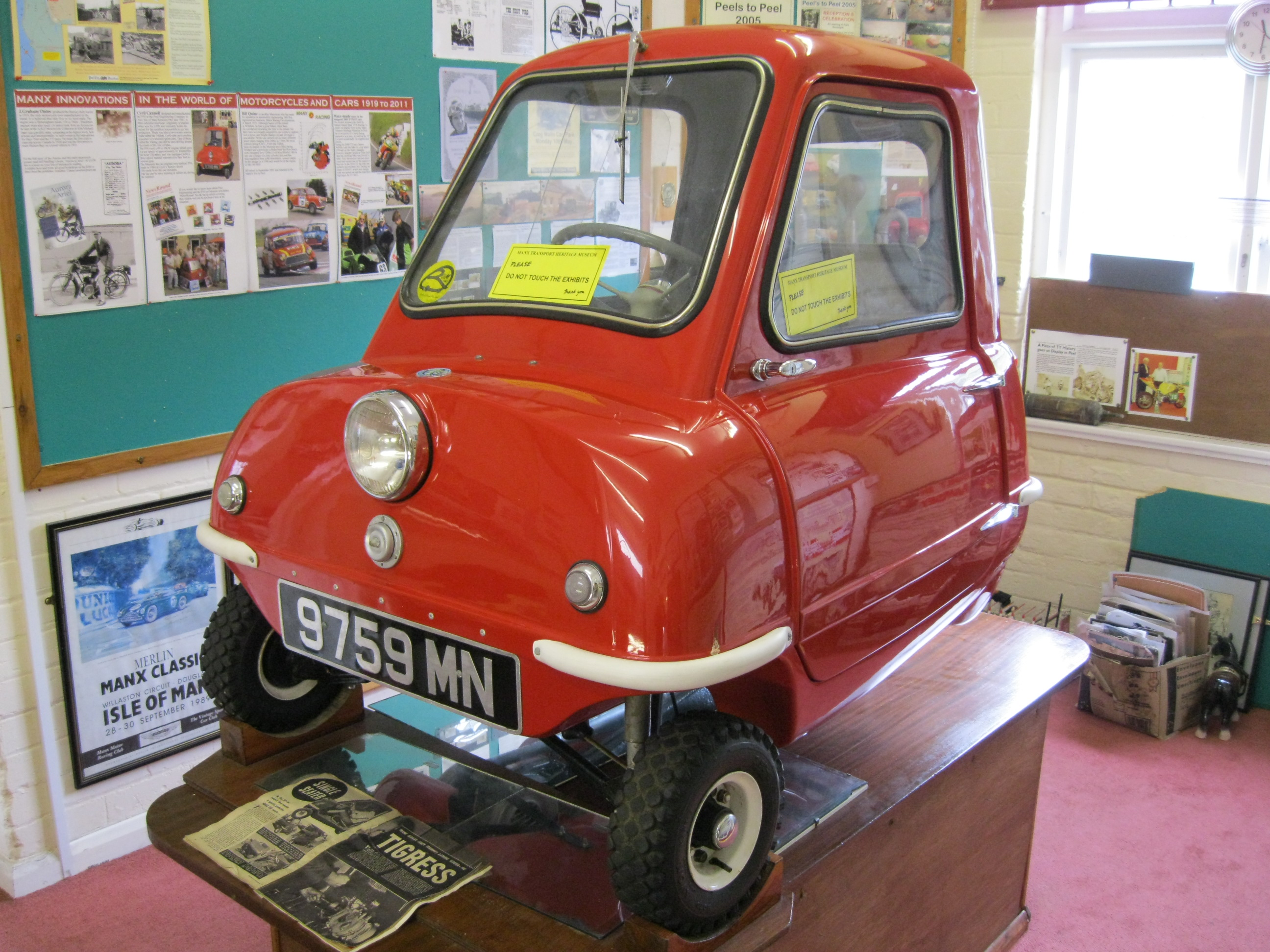
Peel P50 at Manx Transport Museum, Peel

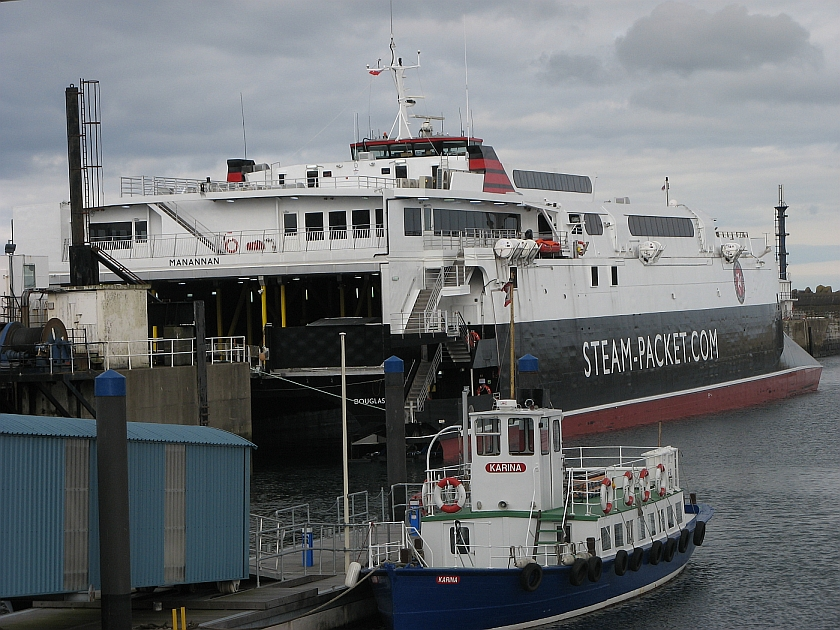
HSC Manannan in Douglas, Isle of Man.

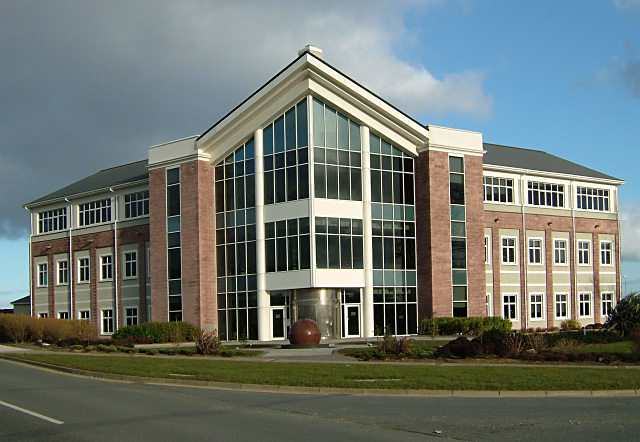
Manx Telecom headquarters in the Isle of Man Business Park, Douglas.
