= Bradford & Bingley International =

- Company type: Subsidiary
- Industry: International banking
- Founded: 1989
- Defunct: 2011
- Fate: Merged with Alliance & Leicester International on 5 August 2011
- Headquarters: Isle of Man
- Products: Savings accounts in sterling, US dollars and euros
- Parent: Santander UK plc
- Website: www.bbi.co.im

Bradford & Bingley International (BBI) was the international banking subsidiary of Bradford & Bingley, which was itself acquired by the Santander Group in 2008.

On 5 August 2011, the business of BBI was transferred to Alliance & Leicester International (ALIL), also a subsidiary of Santander, ahead of the expiry of a trademark licence on the Bradford & Bingley name and image. ALIL was also on the Isle of Man and offered a range of international savings accounts primarily to Isle of Man residents and British expatriates but also to non-domiciles living in the UK, Channel Island residents and expatriates worldwide. The business of ALIL was transferred to the Isle of Man branch of Santander UK plc on 7 May 2013.

== History ==
The company was established in 1989 and had grown to hold over £3 billion in deposits before it was purchased by Abbey National, the UK subsidiary of the Santander Group as part of the deals surrounding UK Government nationalisation of Bradford & Bingley plc, along with the UK savings business.

In October 2009 it was announced that both Bradford & Bingley International and Alliance & Leicester International had made two appointments of the same people to their boards and both banks were moved into the wealth management division of Santander UK. Abbey International, also part of the group, was renamed Santander Private Banking in 2011.

Bradford & Bingley International was merged into Alliance & Leicester International on 5 August 2011 in advance of the expiration of a trademark licence on the Bradford & Bingley name and image in September 2011.
