= Markham Arms, Chelsea =

Former pub in Chelsea, London

Coordinates: 51.489581°N 0.163918°W

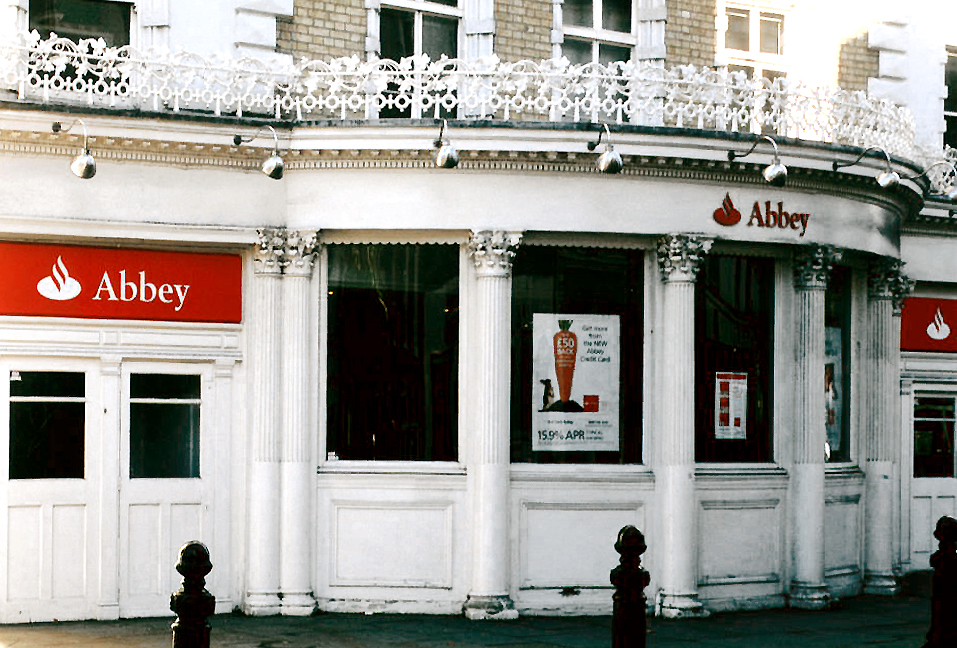

The Markham Arms is a former pub at 138 King's Road, London SW3. It closed as a pub in the early 1990s and was converted into a Building Society. It is now a branch of the Santander bank.

Aqua glass hand size flask 'MARKHAM ARMS, F.D.DEW, CHELSEA' Circa 1892. 13 cm height.

F.D. Dew the publican c.1892 produced hand sized spirit flasks embossed The Markham Arms, Chelsea.

It is a Grade II listed building, built in the mid-19th century.
