= WebID Solutions =

German video-identification company

- Type: GmbH
- Industry: Financial Technology
- Founded: 2012 in Berlin
- Founders: Frank S. Jorga
- Headquarters: Berlin, Germany
- Areas served: Germany, Austria, Switzerland, India, United States, Spain
- Key people: Frank S. Jorga (CEO); Daniel Kreis (CEO); Sven Jorga (CTO)
- Products: Online identification and contract signing software
- Website: webid-solutions.com

WebID Solutions is an international financial technology company based in Berlin that offers products and services for legal transactions conducted online. These include, in particular, personal identification and online signatures. According to Frankfurter Allgemeine Zeitung, the company is considered the inventor of online identification.

== History ==
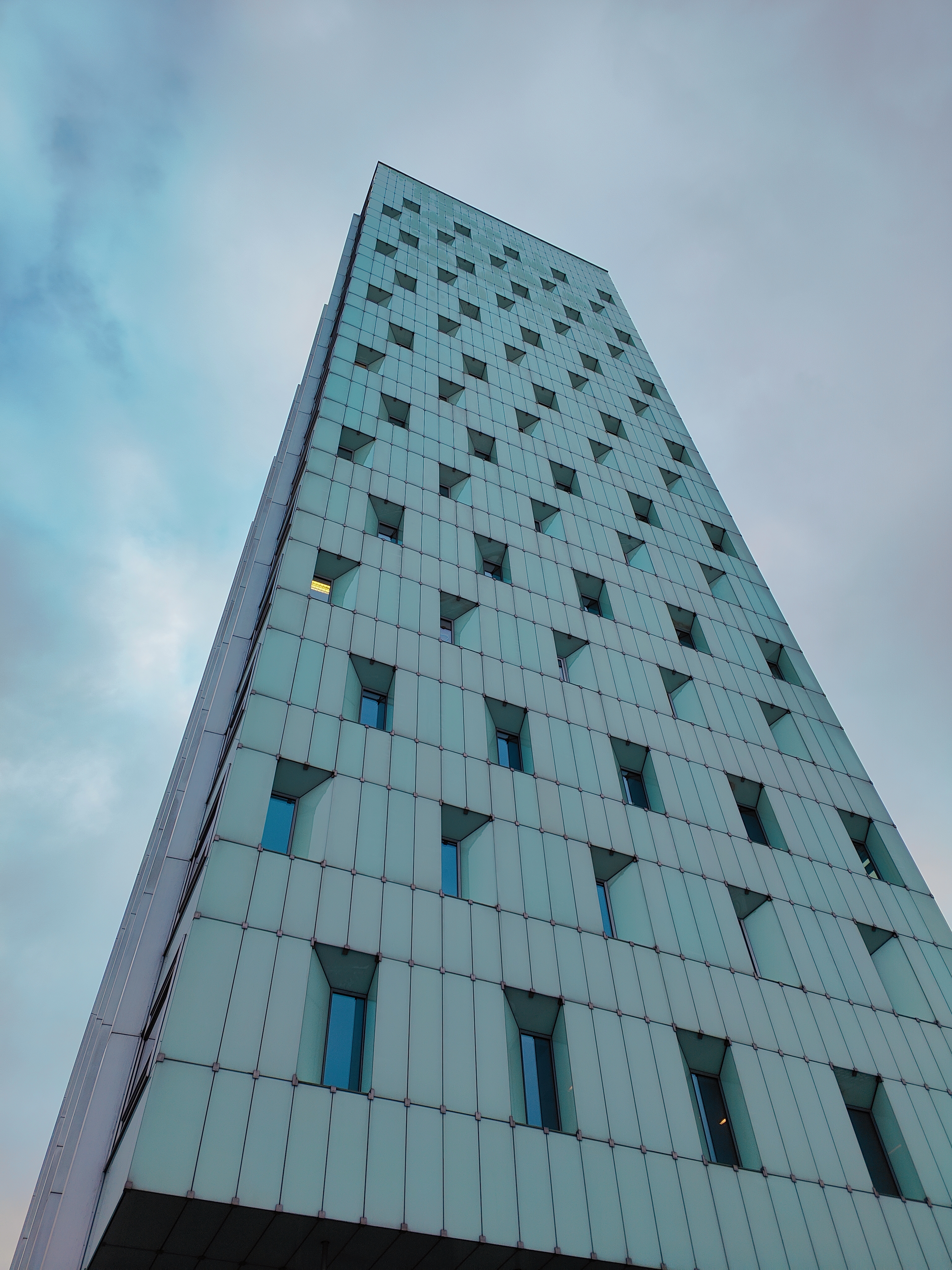
WebID Solutions Headquarters in Hamburg

The company was founded in Berlin in 2012 by Frank S. Jorga. The company developed a method for video identification (VideoIdent), which was approved by Bafin in 2014. WebID was the first online-ID provider on the German market, which resulted in Bafin basing their security regulations for video identification on the WebID procedure and standards.

In the two years following the approval of the method, the company expanded internationally and founded several subsidiaries in Switzerland, Austria, Spain, the US, and India. WebID Solutions patented their online identification in the United States in 2018 and opened an office in New York City.

WebID Solutions was in a legal dispute with a competitor for several years. The competitor accused WebID Solutions of patent infringement, which was proven right in the first instance in 2017. In 2020, however, the Düsseldorf Higher Regional Court dismissed the action as unjustified.

In September 2021 the British investor Anacap took over the majority of WebID Solutions, which was meant to lead towards establishing the company outside of Europe. The establishment in Europe was nevertheless continued, with expansion into Spain in 2022.

== Products and services ==
The company focuses on products and services for legal transactions conducted via the internet. This includes seven methods of personal identification: via video call (VideoID), via online ID (eID), online banking (AccountID), digital authentication (TrueID) or with the help of AI and biometrics (AutoID), as well as age verification (avsID) and online contracting (SignID). These methods are offered and used in sectors such as banking, financial services, healthcare, telecommunications, e-commerce, mobility, gaming, and entertainment.

In Wiesbaden, WebID Solutions also introduced digital resident registration and digital registration for marriage, for the first time in Germany, in 2023.

The online personal identification procedure was developed as an alternative to the long-established Postident procedure of Deutsche Post. It is the first of its kind. WebID Solutions' customers include banks such as Deutsche Bank, ING, DKB and Santander, as well as companies such as Trade Republic, Amazon and Apple. In Germany, around 80% of the leading German banks are WebID Solutions' customers.
