= Alliance & Leicester International =

Former Manx bank

Alliance & Leicester International Limited
- Type: Subsidiary
- Industry: International banking
- Founded: 1990
- Defunct: May 2013
- Fate: Business transferred to parent
- Headquarters: Douglas, Isle of Man
- Products: Savings accounts in sterling, US dollars and euros
- Owner: Santander Group
- Parent: Santander UK plc
- Website: www.alil.co.im

Alliance & Leicester International Limited (ALIL) was the international banking subsidiary of Alliance & Leicester, which was subsequently bought by the Santander Group in October 2008.

The bank offered a range of international savings accounts primarily to Isle of Man residents and British expatriates, but also to non domiciles living in the United Kingdom, Channel Island residents and expatriates worldwide. ALIL's range of accounts included instant access, notice, monthly interest and fixed rate bonds in pound sterling, US dollars and euros.

In May 2010, Alliance & Leicester merged into Santander UK, which was formed by the combination of Santander's existing subsidiary Abbey, with the savings business of Bradford & Bingley. The business of Alliance & Leicester International transferred to Santander UK's Isle of Man branch on 7 May 2013.

== History ==
The bank was formed in 1990, and was based in the Isle of Man. ALIL was one of the largest deposit takers in the Isle of Man, with over £179 million in share capital and reserves. ALIL's eSaver accounts, which were launched in 2007, were the first international savings accounts to offer a purely online application process with no 'wet’ signature.

On 5 August 2011, the business of Bradford & Bingley International, which was also part of the Santander Group, was transferred to Alliance & Leicester International, ahead of the expiry of the trademark licence on the Bradford & Bingley name in September 2011. In March 2013, it was announced that the bank would transfer its business to Santander UK's Isle of Man branch. Customer accounts were transferred on 7 May 2013.
