= Alliance & Leicester =

British building society and bank, 1985–2011

Alliance & Leicester plc
- Type: Subsidiary/Trading name
- Traded as: LSE: AL (until 2008) FTSE 100 component (1997-2008)
- Industry: Financial services
- Founded: 1985
- Defunct: 2011
- Fate: Merged into Santander UK plc
- Successor: Santander UK plc
- Headquarters: Narborough, Leicestershire, England
- Products: Banking, insurance
- Parent: Santander Group
- Website: www.alliance-leicester.co.uk

Alliance & Leicester plc was a British bank and former building society, formed by the merger in 1985 of the Alliance Building Society and the Leicester Building Society. The business demutualised in the middle of 1997, when it was floated on the London Stock Exchange. It was listed in the FTSE 250 Index, and had been listed in the FTSE 100 Index from April 1997 until June 2008.

After running into difficulty during the 2008 financial crisis, the bank was acquired by the Santander Group in October 2008, and transferred its business into Santander UK plc in May 2010.

It was fully integrated and rebranded as Santander by the end of 2011. The bank's international subsidiary based in Douglas, Isle of Man, Alliance & Leicester International, continued to use the name Alliance & Leicester, until it was fully merged into Santander UK in May 2013.

== History ==
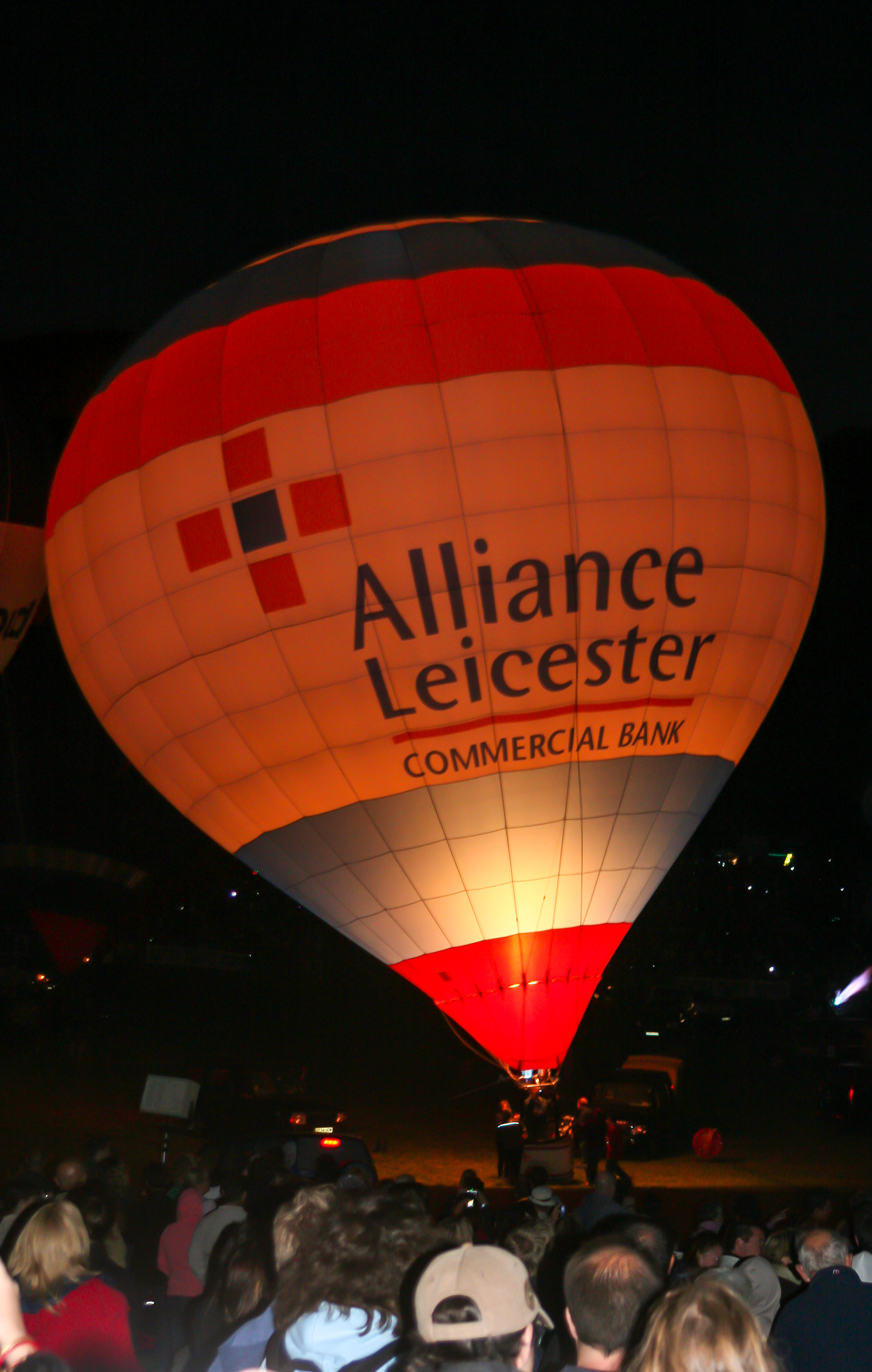
Alliance & Leicester advertising on a balloon

=== Early history ===
The Alliance & Leicester Building Society was formed by the merger of the Alliance Building Society (originally based in and called the Brighton & Sussex Equitable Building Society) and the Leicester Building Society on 1 October 1985. In July 1990 the society acquired Girobank, a major provider of cash handling services to the government and large companies which also offered current accounts from the Post Office.

With other large building societies such as Halifax and Woolwich, Alliance & Leicester decided to float on the London Stock Exchange, generating windfall payments to members worth up to £5,000 each. Flotation took place on 21 April 1997.

From the end of the 1980s until the mid-1990s, Alliance & Leicester undertook a long-running television advertising campaign, featuring comedians Stephen Fry and Hugh Laurie.

=== Takeover ===
Alliance & Leicester had to be offered a secret £3 billion credit line by HM Treasury in November 2007 to prevent insolvency and a run on the bank. On 14 July 2008 the board of A&L recommended that shareholders accept a takeover bid from Banco Santander for around £1.26 billion. This recommendation was ratified by shareholders at meetings on 16 September 2008. The takeover took effect on 10 October 2008, when shares of the company were delisted from the London Stock Exchange.

The bank transferred its business into Santander UK on 28 May 2010, following a hearing at the Royal Courts of Justice on 13 May 2010, as part of the procedure within the Financial Services and Markets Act 2000.

Until this time, Alliance & Leicester was run as a separate institution with its own banking licence while at the same time migrating customer accounts to the Partenon software system. Abbey and the Bradford & Bingley savings business were rebranded in January 2010. Branches of Alliance & Leicester were rebranded at the end of 2010.

== Services ==
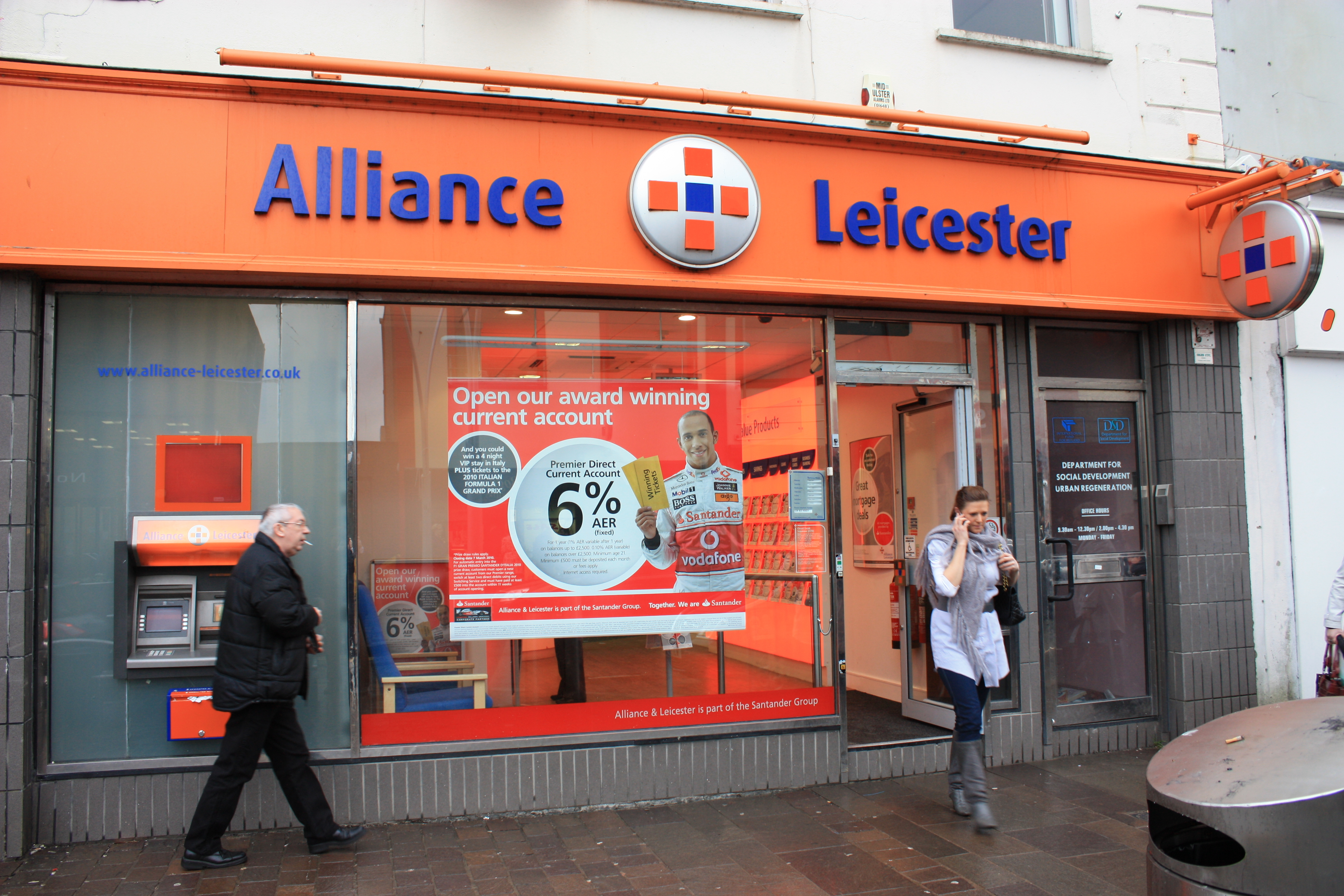
A branch of Alliance & Leicester in Omagh, County Tyrone.

Cards were subsequently reissued with MBNA branding, while Alliance & Leicester began solely providing Santander branded credit cards, provided by Santander Cards Limited.

== Sponsorship ==
Between 2003 and 2007, Alliance & Leicester was the main kit sponsor of English football club Leicester City.

== Arms ==
Coat of arms of Alliance & Leicester

Notes
Granted 2 November 1987.
Crest
A sea fox sejant erect the vulpine parts Gules armed langued and with the piscine parts Azure.
Torse
Argent and Gules
Escutcheon
Azure on a cross couped Argent a square billet Azure between four billets two fesswise in fess and two palewise in pale Gules all within a bordure Argent.
Supporters
Dexter a Dolphin Azure and sinister a Fox Gules armed and langued Azure.
Motto
For Home, Security And Prosperity
