= Cahoot =

Bank in the United Kingdom

Santander UK plc trading as cahoot
- Type: Division of Santander UK plc
- Industry: Finance and insurance
- Founded: June 2000
- Headquarters: Belfast, Northern Ireland, United Kingdom
- Key people: Juan Gomez-Reino, Managing Director
- Products: Financial services
- Website: www.cahoot.com

cahoot is an internet-only division of Santander UK plc, the British subsidiary of the Santander Group. Cahoot was launched in June 2000 as the internet based banking brand of Abbey National plc. Cahoot is based in Belfast, Northern Ireland.

== History ==
There have been several instances of security or operational failures with the website. The launch of the bank in 2000 resulted in the website crashing. One case in November 2004 was a security scare, in which it was revealed that customers' accounts could be accessed without going through security procedures, after an update to the online banking system.

From 15 to 16 October 2008, the secure section of the Cahoot website became unavailable, due, according to Cahoot, to a power outage in Spain. Although the main page of the website operated normally, it proved impossible for customers to log in to access their savings, leaving them unable to access their accounts and carry out transactions. Call centre staff were also unable to carry out any transactions for customers. Customers were able to access their accounts again normally on 17 October 2008.

Prior to the takeover of parent bank Abbey National by Santander, Cahoot recovered from its launch and security issues to achieve over 600,000 accounts, and a significant share of the unsecured lending market in the United Kingdom. It was consistently rated in Consumers' Association and Guardian surveys in the top three best banks in the United Kingdom, for service and pricing.

Initially led by Tim Murley, the role was taken over by Tim Sawyer in November 2002, who was succeeded by John Goddard in September 2005.

Abbey National was renamed with its parent's brand in January 2010, although Cahoot and other specialist brands of the bank were retained by Santander.

== Services ==
Cahoot operates as a division of Santander UK, and shares Santander's banking licence and headquarters. Its business model involves a small operational staff, with IT services outsourced in 2003 to IBM using their "Software on Demand" model. As of 2023, the only products available to new customers are savings accounts.

Cahoot also provided credit cards until they were closed to new business in 2006. Until October 2009, there was also a "Webcard" which generated a one time card number for each online transaction (controlled payment number), as a measure to combat card fraud. A flexible loan service was discontinued in the second quarter of 2009 to 2010, and it was later learned that the product's high interest rate (for some 22%) had been 'frozen' and transferred to Santander at some point. The flexible loan was designed as a credit facility, similar to a credit card, to borrow and repay as necessary, offering attractive interest rates at first.

Cahoot also provided current accounts, though it withdrew these from new business in February 2010. Before January 2010, Cahoot informed customers that their loan limits had been "reviewed" and gave 30 days' notice that the withdrawal service was to cease. On 7 June 2015, Cahoot ceased to pay interest on current account balances. In April 2020, Cahoot withdrew the interest-free overdraft facility on its current accounts.

Cahoot introduced the Faster Payments service on 1 January 2012, the latest date possible under Financial Services Authority regulations.
