= Santander Cycles MK =

Bike-sharing system in Milton Keynes, England

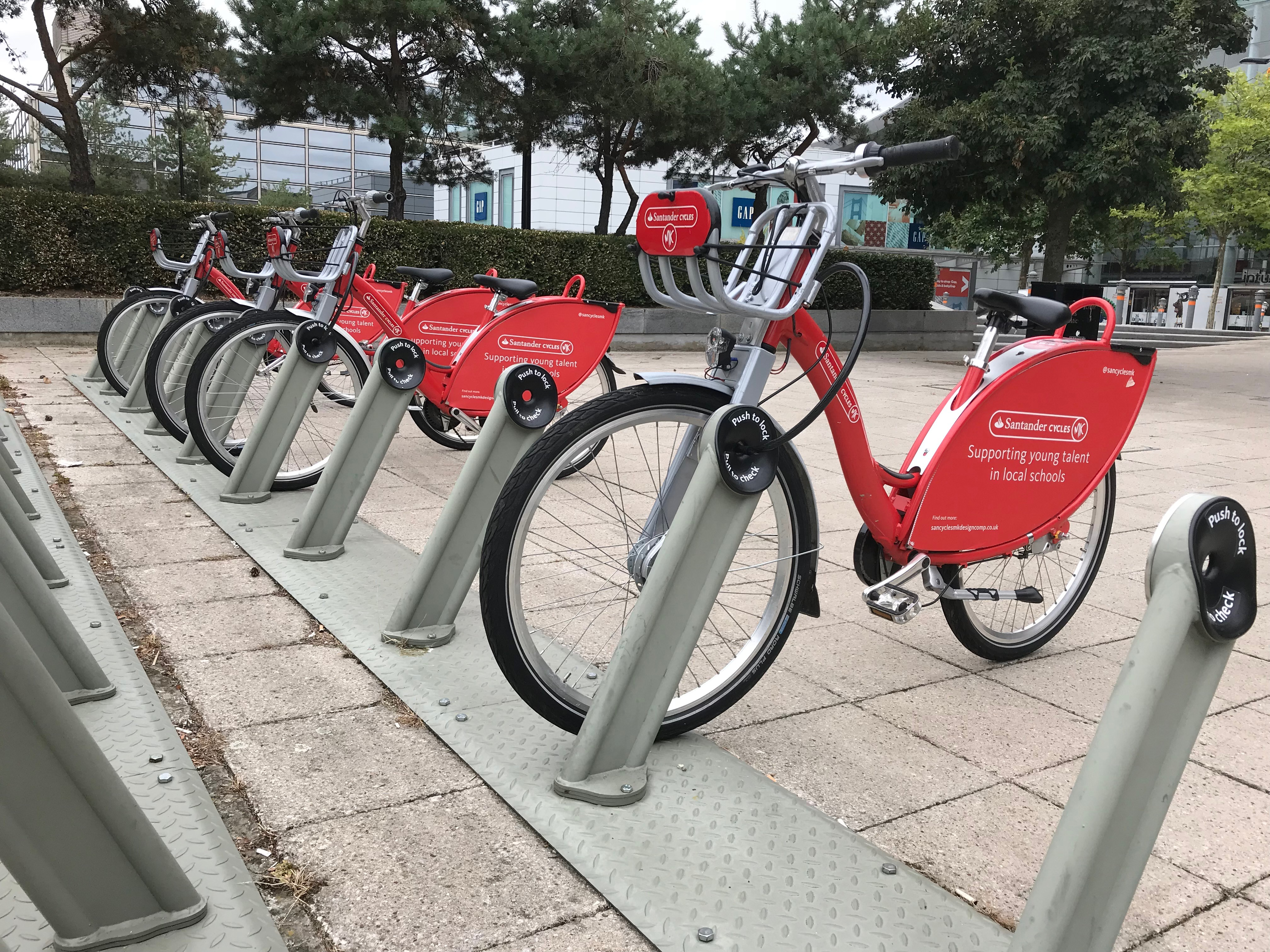

Overview
- Locale: Milton Keynes, United Kingdom
- Transit type: Bicycle-sharing system
- Number of stations: 42
- Website: nextbike.co.uk/milton-keynes

Operation
- Began operation: 17 June 2016; 10 years ago
- Operator: Nextbike
- Number of vehicles: 300

Santander Cycles MK is a bicycle hire scheme based in Milton Keynes, United Kingdom. The scheme is operated by Nextbike and sponsored by Santander UK. The scheme launched on 17 June 2016.

== History ==
After the success of bicycle hire schemes in Belfast, Bath and Glasgow, nextbike announced plans to partner with Santander UK on a new bicycle hire scheme in Milton Keynes, to be known as Santander Cycles MK. The scheme was a collaboration between Santander UK, Milton Keynes Council (MKC) and Milton Keynes City Centre Management. The scheme launched on 17 June 2016 with 300 bikes across 42 docking stations in Milton Keynes. Santander UK ambassador Jenson Button is the face of the bicycle hire scheme. Nextbike is a German company that develops and operates public bike sharing systems with a number of successful bike sharing schemes.

== Operations and Services ==
Users first need to register for the bicycle hire scheme via the Santander Cycles MK website, the Santander Cycles MK app on the App Store or Google Play or by calling 020 8166 9851.

== Prices ==
Users have a choice of two tariffs – 'pay as you ride' or an annual subscription. Users who register for the annual subscription for £60, with the first 30 minutes of every ride free, then it's 50p for every additional 30 minutes. The scheme is also open to casual users through the 'pay as you ride' fare with each rental costing £1.00 per 30 minutes up to a maximum of £10 in any 24 hour period.

== Coverage Area ==
The coverage zone spans the central, leisure and residential areas of Milton Keynes, with cyclists able to make use of the 169.3 mile 'Redway' network to avoid roads on most journeys.

== See also ==
- Nextbike
