= Simcocks Advocates =

Simcocks Advocates is a British law firm based in the Isle of Man. It is one of the Island’s leading offshore legal practices.

== Profile ==
Simcocks is one of the biggest law firms on the Isle of Man. Phil Games is the Chief Executive. Clients include small to medium enterprises, multi-nationals, regulators, and non-governmental organisations and private individuals. The company has four directors: Phil Games, Irini Newby, Alex Spencer and David Spencer.

== History ==
Alfred Howard Simcocks was born in the Isle of Man on 20 December 1915 at the Rushen Abbey Hotel, Ballasalla, and was always known as Howard. He was educated at the Buchan School and King William’s College. Howard was halfway through his accountancy articles in 1939 when he volunteered to enlist in the Manx Regiment. He served in the desert and was blinded in May 1944 at the Battle of Monte Cassino in Italy.

He spent some time recuperating at St Dunstan’s rehabilitation centre in Shropshire before returning to the Isle of Man. He became a law student with the help and support of retired Attorney General, Ramsey Moore. He qualified and was formally admitted to the Bar as a Manx Advocate in August 1948. Howard passed his exams by dictating his answers to a clerk in the Rolls Office.

Helen Kinvig became his secretary and was to be his eyes and ears for the rest of his working life. In the 1950s Howard acquired a tandem and Miss Kinvig used to "drive" him to the Castletown office from Ballasalla and back.

In 1949 Howard and Advocate Stanley Allen went into partnership. They used their names and borrowed part of an established name to help launch their fledgling business which later became the Simcocks brand. Outside of the legal arena Howard took part in many activities. He was a member of the Abbey Choir and composed verses for members to sing to alongside well–known tunes at church concerts. He was a Parochial Church Council member and a churchwarden for many years. Howard became a member of Malew Parish Commissioners and was an MHK for Rushen from 1956 to 1974.

He was also a member of the Legislative Council. He served on many boards of Tynwald, latterly as chairman of the Water Authority. He was also an active member of the Royal British Legion and was awarded an MBE. He also contributed many newspaper articles on the Manx political scene.

Howard practised as an advocate until 1990 when he retired to Winchester. He died in January 1995. His ashes are buried in Malew Parish Church yard.

== Main practice areas ==
The firm's main areas of practice are banking and finance, corporate and commercial law, dispute resolution, private client and property. The company also works in employment, insurance and estate planning.
