= Cater Allen =

UK private bank

Cater Allen Limited
- Trade name: Cater Allen Private Bank
- Type: Limited company
- Industry: Finance, Wealth Management
- Founded: 1816
- Headquarters: London, England, UK
- Key people: Kitty McCormick (CEO)
- Products: Financial services
- Owner: Santander Group
- Parent: Santander UK plc
- Website: caterallen.co.uk

Cater Allen Limited, trading as Cater Allen Private Bank, is a private bank in the United Kingdom and a wholly owned subsidiary of Santander UK. The bank provides banking and savings products to individuals, businesses and professional intermediaries.

Founded in 1816, Cater Allen is one of the longest-established private banking institutions in the United Kingdom.

The bank operates as part of the Santander UK group, which is itself owned by the Spanish banking group Banco Santander.

== History ==
Cater Allen traces its origins to a banking business established in Blackburn, England in 1816.

During the nineteenth and twentieth centuries the bank developed a reputation for providing private and intermediary banking services to professional advisers and their clients.

In 1997 the business was acquired by Abbey National, forming part of Abbey National's private banking operations.

Following the acquisition of Abbey National by Banco Santander in 2004, Cater Allen became part of the Santander banking group.

Today Cater Allen operates as a specialist private banking brand within Santander UK.

== Operations ==
Cater Allen operates as a specialist banking division within Santander UK, providing current accounts, savings accounts and deposit products for personal and business customers.

A significant part of the bank’s activity is conducted through professional intermediaries such as accountants, solicitors and financial advisers who introduce or manage banking relationships for their clients.

This intermediary model is commonly used in financial arrangements such as estate administration, trust management and pension structures where professional advisers act on behalf of clients or beneficiaries.

== Services ==
Cater Allen provides a range of banking services including:

- Current accounts
- Savings accounts
- Fixed-term deposit accounts
- Notice savings accounts

The bank also supports banking arrangements linked to specialist financial structures where funds are managed on behalf of others, including trusts and pension structures.

These arrangements may include banking connected with:

- Trust structures
- Self-invested personal pension (SIPP)
- Small self-administered schemes (SSAS)
- Estate administration by executors and personal representatives
- Fiduciary roles such as deputies appointed by the Court of Protection

== Intermediary banking ==
Cater Allen’s distribution model includes working with professional intermediaries who introduce or manage banking relationships on behalf of clients.

These intermediaries may include:

- Accountants
- Solicitors
- Independent financial advisers
- Pension administrators
- Trustees

This structure allows banking services to be used within legal and financial arrangements where professional oversight is required.

== Ownership ==
Cater Allen is a subsidiary of Santander UK plc, one of the largest banks in the United Kingdom and part of the global Banco Santander banking group.

Banco Santander is one of the largest banking groups in Europe and operates across retail, commercial and private banking sectors internationally.

== See also ==
- Santander UK
- Banco Santander
- Private banking
- Self-invested personal pension
- Trust law
- Court of Protection
