= Abbey National =

Former British bank and building society

Abbey National plc
- Type: Subsidiary
- Traded as: LSE: ABBY (until 2005) FTSE 100 component (until 2005)
- Industry: Financial Services
- Founded: 1944
- Defunct: 2010
- Fate: Renamed under parent brand
- Successor: Santander UK Plc
- Headquarters: United Kingdom
- Key people: Lord Burns; Chairman; António Horta Osório; Chief Executive
- Products: Banking and Insurance
- Number of employees: 20,000
- Parent: Santander Group
- Subsidiaries: Abbey National Treasury Services; Abbey International; Cahoot; Cater Allen
- Website: www.abbey.com

The Abbey National Building Society was formed in 1944 by the merger of the Abbey Road and the National building societies.

It was the first building society in the United Kingdom to demutualise, doing so in July 1989. The bank expanded through a number of acquisitions in the 1990s, including James Hay, Scottish Mutual, Scottish Provident and the rail leasing company Porterbrook. Abbey National launched an online bank, Cahoot, in June 2000.

In September 2003, the bank rebranded as Abbey, and in November 2004, it became a wholly owned subsidiary of the Spanish Santander Group, with a rebrand following in February 2005. In January 2010, the savings business of Bradford & Bingley was combined with the bank, and Abbey National plc was renamed Santander UK plc. Prior to the takeover, Abbey National plc was a constituent of the FTSE 100 Index.

== History ==
=== Pre-merger: The National Building Society ===
The National Building Society had its origins in the freehold land movement, sometimes called the “forty shilling freeholders movement”. In country areas, the voting entitlement was dependent on the possession of freehold land with an annual value of £2. This required a capital outlay of some £60-70 and was outside the reach of the average worker. A scheme to obviate this capital requirement was launched in 1847 as the Birmingham Freehold Land Society. In simple terms, the society arranged for the purchase of tracts of land and divided them into plots which individuals could purchase, the cost being met by regular subscriptions. The success of the Birmingham Society prompted a flood of other societies around the country, of which the National was one.

In 1849 The Metropolitan Freehold Land Society was formed, led by such prominent MPs as Joshua Walmsley, Joseph Hume and above all Richard Cobden. An application was made to register under the 1836 Building Societies Act but the registrar refused to accept the name. Accordingly, the name was changed to The National Permanent Mutual Building Society, with an authorization for it to be commonly called The National Freehold Land Society. Despite the building society registration and formal name, there was no doubt as to the National's function. The 1852 Prospectus clearly stated that “The special objects of this Society are to facilitate the acquisition of freehold land, and the erection of houses thereon – to enable such of its members as are eligible, to obtain the county franchise”. (The name was changed in 1894 to The National Freehold Land and Building Society and finally to The National Building Society in 1930).

The Society was not allowed to purchase land in its own name, so purchases were made by the Trustees and quickly thirteen estates were purchased around London. Within four years, the National had become the largest land society in the country. There were over 100 such societies in existence and the National claimed to be taking forty per cent of the funds. Once the plots had been purchased, the National recognized the need to provide finance for the houses that were to be built on them. In 1854 it published its first advert, inviting applications for advances “for the erection of houses on the Estates”; those advances were not to exceed two-thirds of the net value and to be repaid over ten years.

Because the Society was not legally allowed to hold land in its own name, in 1858 it formed a separate company British Land to take over all the land previously held in the name of the Trustees. All the capital was subscribed by the National's own investors but although British Land was financially distinct, there was a commonality of directors and staff. The objective was to make the National “more emphatically than it has ever been yet, a Savings Bank and Building Society.” At that point, British Land accounted for two thirds of the National's advances. The importance of British Land to the National gradually diminished although it was not until 1874 that the proportion fell to below one half; after an internal row over the ownership of the National's head office, all the advances were repaid in 1878.

The repayment of the British Land loans marked the final break with the old freehold land movement and this was formalized in 1880 when the National incorporated under the Building Societies Act 1874. This gave it two important advantages: it could act under its own name and it afforded limited liability to its members, probably a comfort after the events of 1878. In that year the City of Glasgow Bank collapsed creating widespread financial uncertainty. In the event, funds flowed into the National in excess of its ability to find borrowers and it decided to deploy surplus funds in the north of England. Losses were incurred and the National confined its operations to within 100 miles of London.

Elkington described the 30 years from 1890 as a period of consolidation with the Society always in the top dozen nationally. However, in the period after WW1 there was exceptional growth both for the industry and the National in particular. Over a 15-year period the advances of the Building Societies Association rose eight-fold whereas those of the National rose by a factor of twenty.

=== Pre-merger: The Abbey Road Building Society ===
The Abbey was founded in 1874 by members of the Free Church in Abbey Road and of the Abbey Road Church Benefit Society. The chosen name of the society was the Abbey Road and St John's Wood Mutual Benefit Building Society and it was launched in 1875. Three years later the Society registered under the Building Societies Act 1874 (37 & 38 Vict. c. 42) and the name was changed to the Abbey Road and St John's Wood Permanent Building Society. In contrast to the high-profile public figures who founded the National, the start of Abbey Road was more modest. By 1888, the address was still at the schoolroom of the Abbey Road Church and the Secretary advised that he would be available on Friday evenings at his home. The early years saw rapid growth in members of the Society from 111 in that first year to over 1,000 in 1884, reaching 2,000 in 1881, 3,000 in 1901 and over 7,000 by the outbreak of WWI. A new office was eventually required in 1906.

However, even after the War, the Abbey Road “was little known outside the borough of Paddington in which it was situated” The catalyst for change was the arrival of Sir Harold Bellman, later a commanding figure in the building society sector. He joined the board of management in 1918 and became Secretary of the Society in 1921. He overhauled every aspect of the operations, introduced improvements, advertised in the national press and opened branches outside the Society's home area. By 1929, the number of members had exceeded 100,000 and these doubled in the following two years. It was in this inter-war period that Abbey overtook the National in size: in 1918, the National had £1.2m assets against Abbey Road's £0.8m whereas in 1939 Abbey's assets totalled £51m against the £36m of the National.

In 1932, the society moved into new headquarters, Abbey House, at 219–229 Baker Street, London, which it occupied until 2002. The site was thought to include 221B Baker Street, the fictional home of Sherlock Holmes, and for many years Abbey employed a secretary charged with answering mail sent to Holmes at that address.

=== The Merger ===
WWII brought a cessation to new housebuilding and the building societies preoccupation was supporting mortgage owners and the consequences of bomb damage to properties. By 1943, as the prospect of victory increased, the Government led discussions on post-war reconstruction. The National's Chairman, Stanley Ramsey, argued that greater scale would be needed to deal with the financial challenges of reconstruction and in 1943 he proposed a merger to the Abbey Road. The merger under the Abbey National Building Society name was implemented at the beginning of 1944 with Sir Harold Bellman as chairman and Stanley Ramsey as his deputy. At the time of the merger, Abbey Road was the second largest society and National, the sixth.

=== Post-war Consolidation ===
The post-war Labour government ensured that resources for housing reconstruction was almost entirely concentrated on local authority housing, while stringent controls severely limited the private sector, the building societies’ natural market. Between 1951 and 1954, the Conservative government removed building controls and the growth in home ownership and private housebuilding resumed. However, the Society still had little more than a hundred branches and, with the pre-war management still in control, perhaps it was no longer as innovative. Eventually, 1963 saw the departure of the “old guard”: Chairman Harold Bellman died aged 76; Bruce Wycherley, general manager of the National from 1933 and chief executive of the merged group from 1948, resigned, as did Stanley Ramsey the “original architect” of the merger.

=== Expansion and Innovation ===
Abbey National was now set for rapid expansion. By 1968, the branch network had reached 150 and assets exceeded £1bn. In the next ten years the business of four other societies was acquired: the Definite Permanent in 1968, The State Building Society in 1970, Highgate Building Society in 1974 and the Oak Co-operative in 1979. In 1971, the Abbey was opening a branch per week and in 1974, the peak of the private housing boom, there were 335 branches and £3bn. assets. This growth could not have taken place without the increase in new private housebuilding and the expansion in home ownership that created the second-hand market; it also reflected more innovative marketing policies. This innovation reached its peak with the appointment of Clive Thornton as general manager in 1979. He led a wide range of marketing initiatives, perhaps the best known being the registration of the name "Granny Bonds" to rival the National Savings product.

Thornton was more than a passive supplier of funds to house purchasers. He took an activist approach to the housebuilding industry arguing that building societies should finance building of houses and flats to rent privately. In 1980, the Abbey set aside £250m to stimulate the private homes sector. Thornton worked with Local Authorities to finance inner city renovation, one of the best-known examples being the loan of £3m to the Stockbridge Village Trust to help regenerate 4,000 houses on a rundown council estate in Knowsley. Abbey even formed its own private housebuilding company, Abbey National Homes, in 1986. It built 2-300 houses a year but during the housing recession of 1990-92 it lost over £50m and was closed. The range of services offered brought Abbey National ever closer to a clearing bank. In 1988, Abbey introduced a full-service interest-bearing cheque account; its administration was restricted by building society rules and the need to find a partner that could clear Abbey's cheques (The Co-operative Bank). Later, Abbey became a full member of the Bankers' Automated Clearing Services (BACS) and became member of the BACS and CHAPS clearing systems. The stage was set for Abbey to end its mutual status and become a public company.

In 1987, as a result of financial deregulation enshrined in the Building Societies Act 1986 and Financial Services Act 1986 which allowed financial institutions to own estate agencies, Abbey National launched its own estate agency chain; Cornerstone, purchasing many smaller chains and individual offices with a view to opening a new channel for selling mortgages and endowment policies.

=== Demutualisation ===
The former 'house roof umbrella' logo

The Abbey National Building Society became the first of the United Kingdom building societies to demutualise, and became a public limited company as Abbey National plc on 12 July 1989. Members of the society were given 100 free shares, and had the option to purchase further shares at £1.30, while the opening price per share on the LSE was £1.61. After demutualisation, small investors owned a third of the company.

The demutualisation process was marred by the discovery of a large number of undelivered share certificates awaiting destruction at a contractor's premises. Abbey National shares peaked at more than £14 in 2000, before the stock market began a long decline.

=== Development ===
After losses of at least £243 million, Abbey National decided to sell its estate agency business Cornerstone to two entrepreneurs, Tony Snarey and Bill McClintock, in a management buyout backed by insurance company Provident Life for £8 million in August 1993. The 347-strong chain employed 1,800 staff and was subject to a write-down of £138 million in March 1993 following annual losses since 1989 of at c. £20 million. Having sold off around 280 branches in 1994, the remaining 70 branches of Cornerstone (although over 200 of the sold branches continued to use the name at the time) were put into receivership in October 1995.

In July 1994, Abbey National purchased James Hay, one of the United Kingdom's foremost independent providers of self administered pensions. James Hay then went on to grow in strength and launched Abbey Wrap, a service in which IFAs can keep the clients' ISAs, PEPs, offshore bonds, and SIPP in one place. Abbey Wrap Managers was FSA approved in August 2003. This was relaunched as James Hay Wrap in June 2005.

In February 1995, Abbey National Baring Derivatives were taken down along with Barings Bank, due to failures in regulation and control, especially in regards to Nick Leeson of Barings Bank. In the summer of 1995, Abbey National purchased First National Finance Corporation, a consumer credit company, for about £285 million. Two life assurance companies were demutualised and acquired, Scottish Mutual Assurance in 1992 and Scottish Provident in 2001, which enabled Abbey to pursue the bancassurance model.

In August 1996, Abbey National took over the National & Provincial Building Society, which was itself the product of a 1982 merger between the Provincial Building Society and the Burnley Building Society. This merger increased Abbey National's branch network by almost two hundred branches and brought in three million more customers.

In April 2000, Abbey bought Porterbrook from Stagecoach Group for £773 million. Porterbrook was one of the three railway rolling stock operating companies created from by the privatisation of British Rail, leasing rolling stock to the train operating companies in the United Kingdom. The bank launched its online bank, Cahoot, in June 2000. In August 2000 The First National subsidiary purchased Highway Vehicle Management from GUS plc for £170 million.

Lloyds TSB attempted to merge with the bank in July 2001, though that was ultimately rejected by the Competition Commission.

The bank shortened its name and dropped the previous umbrella logo in 2003.

At first, this provided a good profit stream, despite the criticisms of some analysts. This eventually undid the company, however, when Enron turned out to be unsafe and the 11 September attacks in New York damaged confidence in various financial areas. From this point, Abbey struggled from financial losses and a tarnished image. The chief executive, Ian Harley, a long-time Abbey employee, resigned and his post was filled by an outsider, Luqman Arnold.

Arnold spearheaded a major reorganisation of the bank. The First National business was sold, with the car hire business sold to Lloyds TSB for £46 million, with the remaining business sold to General Electric for £848 million. In September 2003 the brand name was shortened to Abbey, the abbey.com domain name launched and the Abbey National umbrella logo dropped. Banking literature was also simplified as part of the programme, labelled 'turning banking on its head'.

=== Takeover and rebrand ===
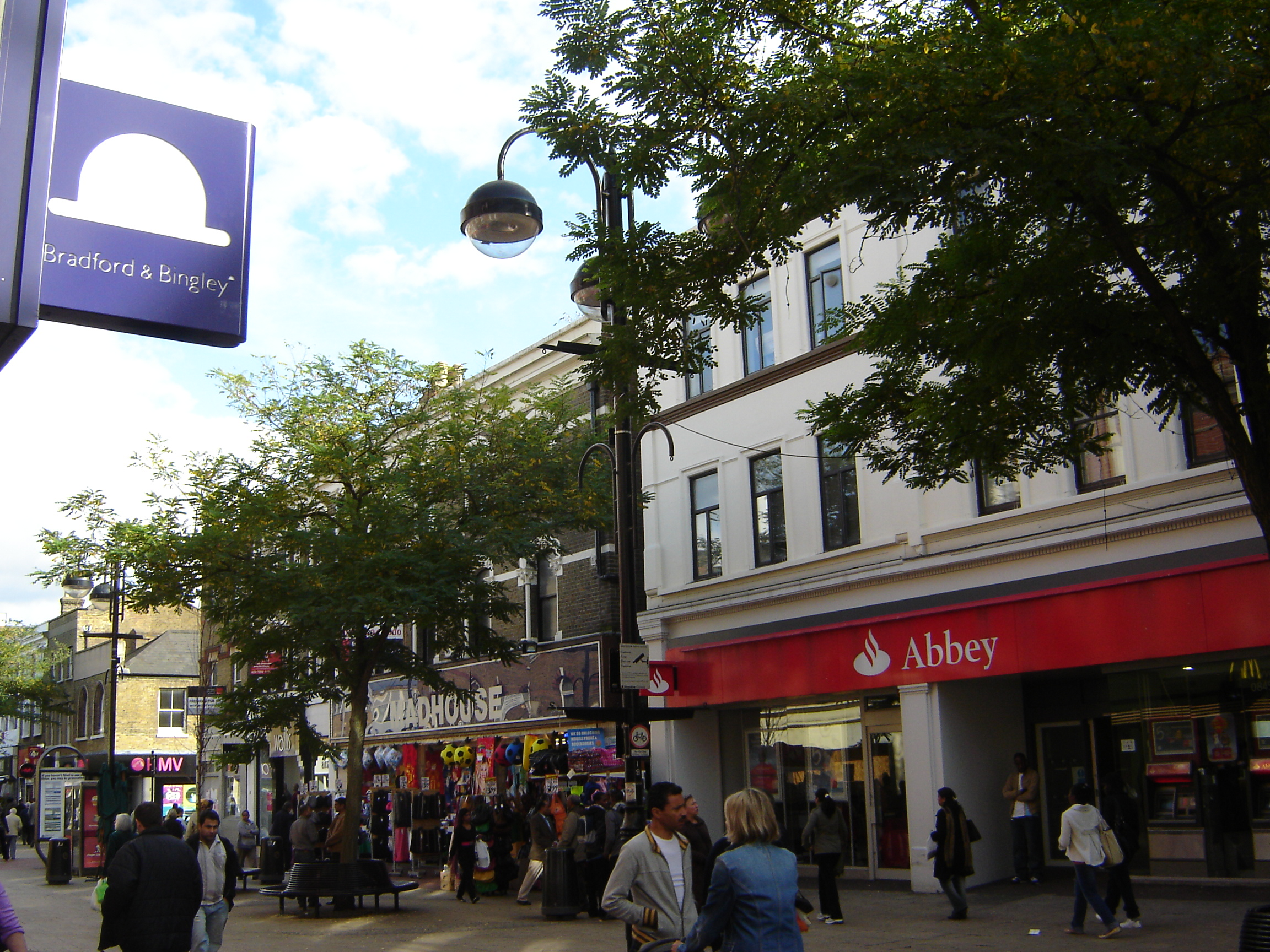
Branches of Bradford & Bingley and Abbey opposite each other on Hounslow High Street prior to the January 2010 rebranding

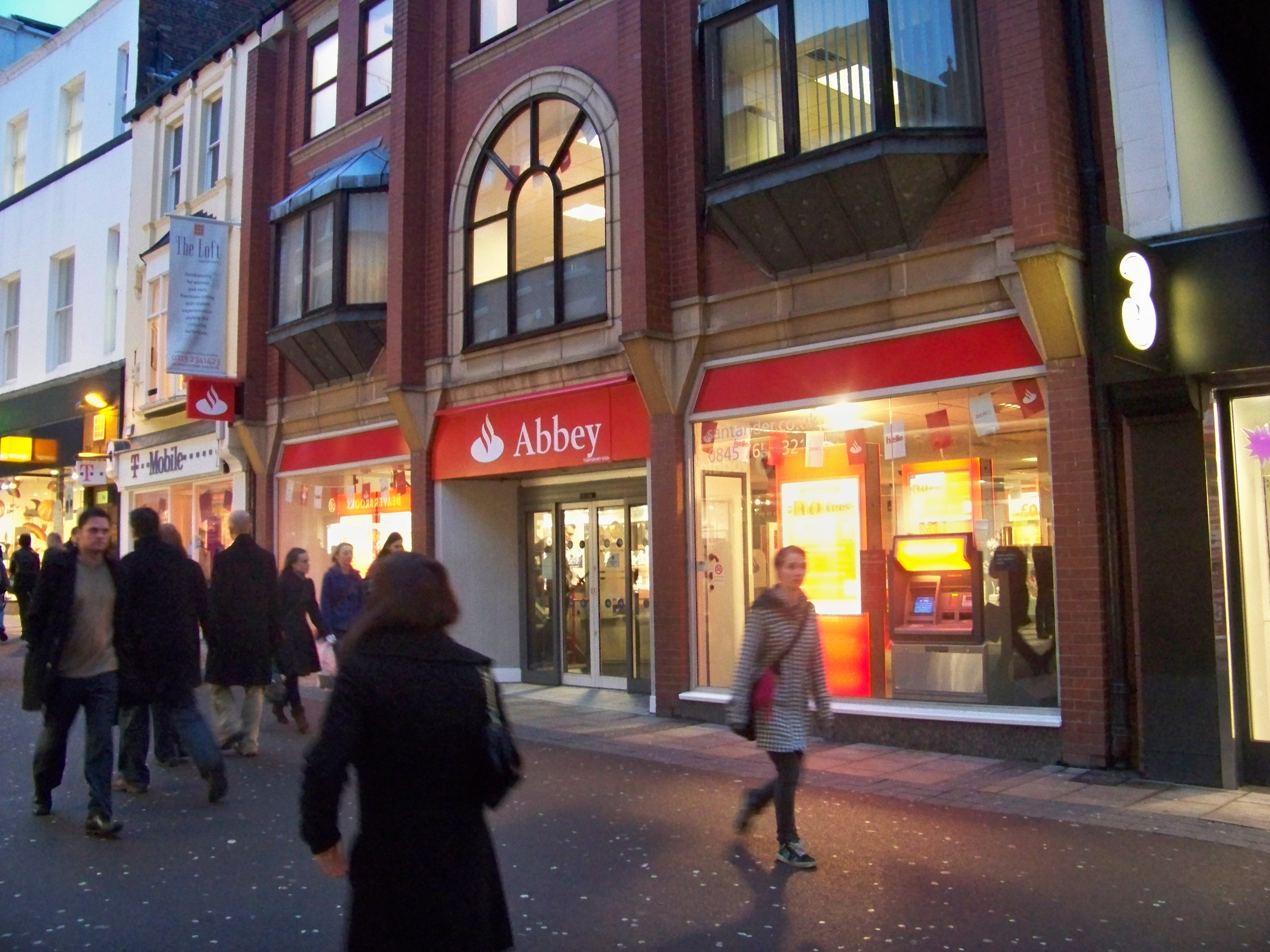
A branch of Abbey on Commercial Street, Leeds showing Santander marketing material in the windows in January 2010.

On 26 July 2004, Abbey National plc and Banco Santander Central Hispano, SA announced that they had reached agreement on the terms of a recommended acquisition by Banco Santander of Abbey.

Following shareholders' approval at the EGMs of Abbey (95 per cent voted in favour, despite vocal opposition from most of those present) and Santander, the acquisition was formally approved by the courts and Abbey became part of the Santander Group on 12 November 2004.

Francisco Gómez Roldán took over as chief executive from Luqman Arnold, who received a rumoured £5 million, made up of pay off and share options. Gómez-Roldán died suddenly in July 2006, three weeks before being succeeded by Antonio Horta Osorio.

In June 2006, Abbey agreed to sell its life businesses to Resolution plc. The businesses sold to Resolution were Scottish Mutual Assurance, Scottish Provident Limited and Abbey National Life, two offshore life companies, Scottish Mutual International and Scottish Provident International Life Assurance Limited.

In July 2007, Abbey admitted that errors that it made in the 1980s have contributed to many borrowers' mortgage terms being extended by up to 15 years. During this period – which saw considerable turbulence in interest rates – Abbey extended the terms on customers' repayment style mortgages without their knowledge. The Financial Ombudsman Service stated that Abbey customers may be eligible for compensation.

As a result of the banking crisis of 2008, Abbey purchased the savings business and branches of Bradford & Bingley in September 2008 following the nationalisation of B&B by HM Government. The purchase of Alliance & Leicester by Santander had been agreed earlier that month.

Abbey migrated all customer accounts to the Partenon computer software used by Santander in June 2008. On 27 October 2008, Abbey reached an agreement to sell Porterbrook to a consortium of Deutsche Bank, Lloyds TSB and Antin Infrastructure Partners.

The Santander Group announced in May 2009 that Abbey and the Bradford & Bingley branch network would be renamed under the Santander brand on 11 January 2010. Credit cards issued by Abbey were the first to change to Santander.

The Cater Allen, James Hay and Cahoot brands remained. Santander UK plc also retained the name Abbey National Treasury Services ltd ("ANTS") for the division responsible for managing its liquidity, risk management and wholesale banking needs.

== Operations ==
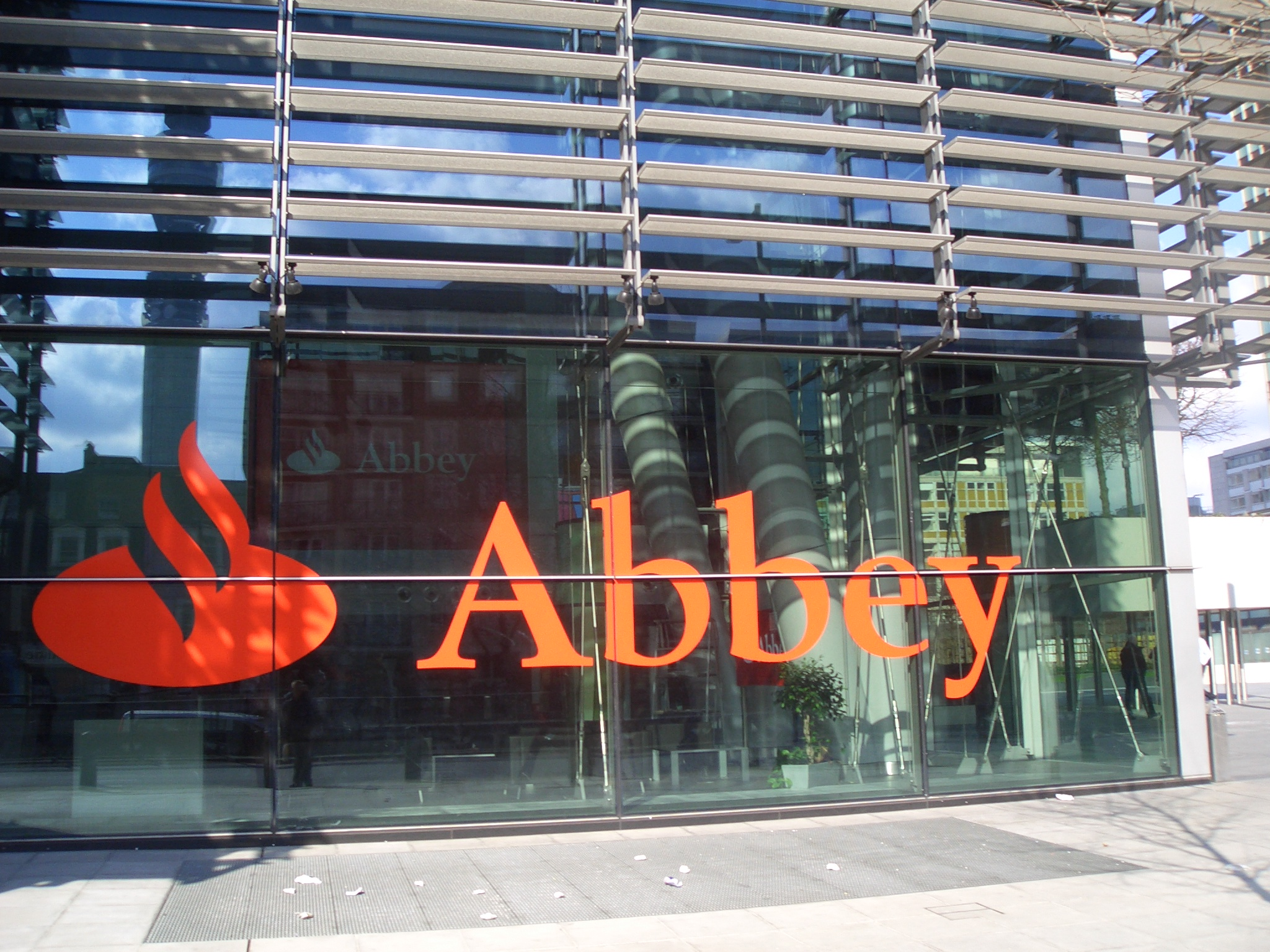
Abbey National House, the bank's registered office in London

Abbey's registered office was in London (built on the site of the former Thames Television studios in Euston Road) and its main corporate centre was in Milton Keynes. Its savings and banking administration departments were in Bradford, with mortgage centres in Thornaby-on-Tees and Whiteley (which closed in 2010).

Investments were previously branded as Inscape, but were renamed Premium Investments in the end of 2008, provided by Santander Portfolio Management.

== Arms ==
Coat of arms of Abbey National
Notes Granted 18 March 1944. Crest On a wreath of the colours a lion statant Or gorged with a chain hanging therefrom a key wards to the sinister Gules. Escutcheon Argent a cross Gules over all a castle Sable. Supporters On either side a lion Or charged on the shoulder with a billet that on the dexter sable with a fleur-de-lis Or that on the sinister Ermine with a sword erect Gules. Motto Aedificium Nostrum Bene Stat

== Sources ==
- Sir Harold Bellman, The Thrifty Three Millions, 1935, London
- Sir Harold Bellman, Bricks and Mortals, 1949, Hutchinson
- George Elkington, The National Building Society 1849-1934, 1935, Cambridge
- Berry Ritchie, A Key to the Door, 1990, London
- Margaret Reid, Abbey National Conversion to Plc,1991, London
- E J Cleary, The Building Society Movement, 1965, London
- Seymour J Price, Building Societies Their Origin and History, 1958. London
- Fred Wellings, British Housebuilders: History & Analysis, 2006, Blackwell Publishing
