= Santander UK =

British bank, wholly owned by the Spanish Santander Group

Santander UK plc

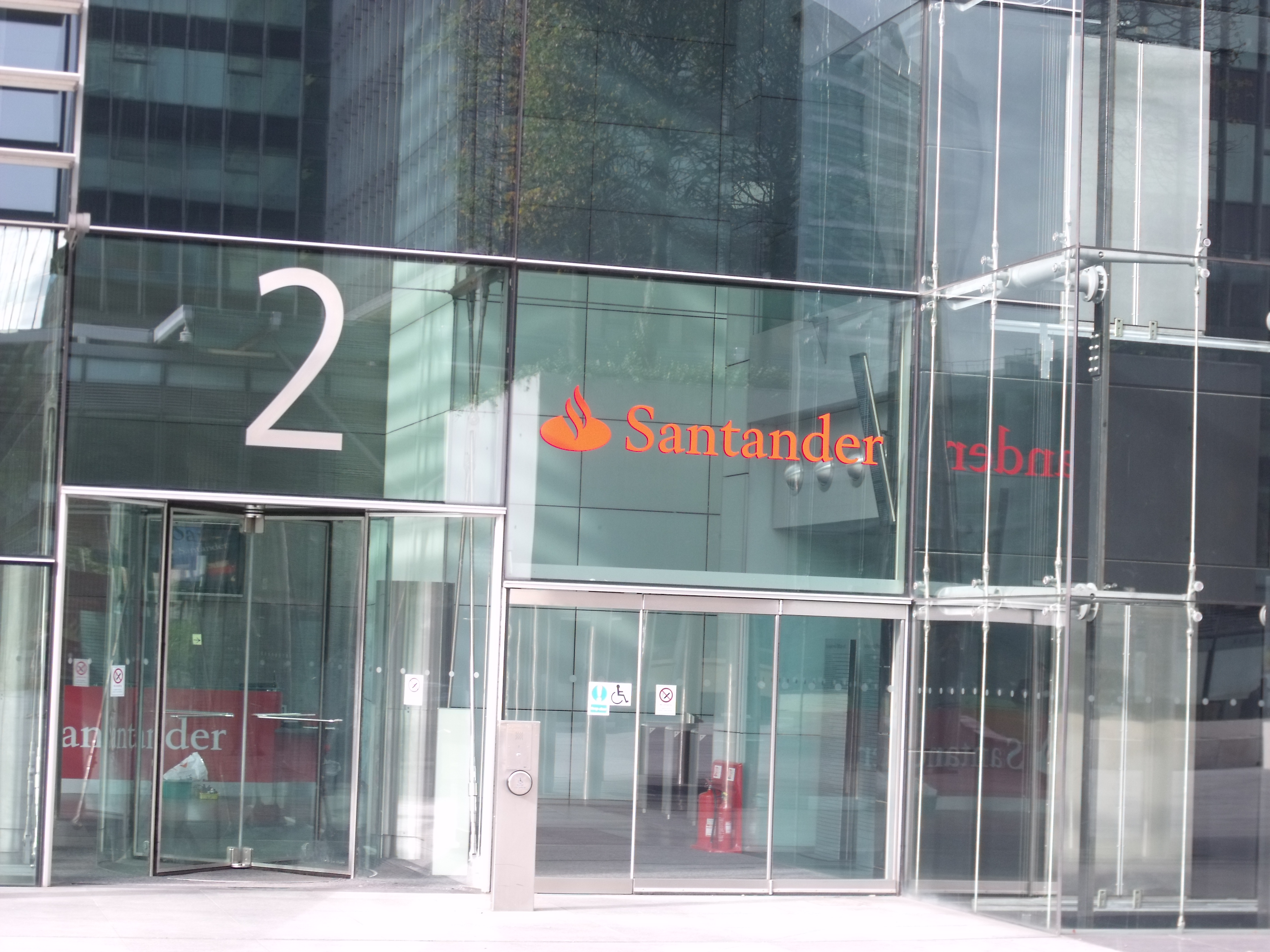
- Head office in London
- Formerly: Abbey National plc (1988–2010)
- Type: Public limited company
- Industry: Finance and Insurance
- Predecessor: Abbey National; Alliance & Leicester; Bradford & Bingley
- Founded: 11 January 2010
- Headquarters: London, England, UK
- Key people: Mahesh Aditya (CEO)
- Products: Financial services
- Operating income: ▲£4.729 billion (2025)
- Net income: ▲£1.086 billion (2025)
- Total assets: ▲£266.837 billion (2025)
- Number of employees: ▼18,000 (2025)
- Parent: Santander Group
- Divisions: Cahoot; Santander Corporate and Commercial Banking; Santander Private Banking
- Subsidiaries: Santander Financial Services plc; Cater Allen; TSB Bank plc
- Website: santander.co.uk

Santander UK plc (UK: /ˌsæntənˈdɛər, -tæn-/, US: /ˌsɑːntɑːnˈdɛər/) is a British bank, wholly owned by Banco Santander, a Spanish bank. Santander UK plc manages its affairs autonomously, with its own local management team, responsible solely for its performance.

Santander UK is one of the leading personal financial services companies in the United Kingdom, and one of the largest providers of mortgages and savings in the United Kingdom. As of May 2025, the bank has 18,000 employees, 14 million active customers, and 64 corporate business centres.

The bank, with its head office in London's Regent's Place, was established on 11 January 2010, when Abbey National plc was combined with the savings business and branches of Bradford & Bingley plc, and renamed Santander UK plc. Alliance & Leicester plc merged into the renamed business in May 2010. In 2023, Santander UK also opened its new UK headquarters, although the office at Triton Square remains as the bank's registered UK office. As of 30 April 2026, Santander UK has now completed the cash acquisition of TSB.

== History ==
=== Establishment ===
The bank has its origins in three constituent companies—Abbey National, Alliance & Leicester and Bradford & Bingley—all former mutual building societies.

Abbey National, trading as Abbey, had been bought by the Santander Group in July 2004 for £9 billion. Santander purchased Alliance & Leicester in the middle of September 2008, followed by the branches and savings business of Bradford & Bingley, which had been nationalised by HM Government during the 2008 financial crisis.

Abbey National and the savings business and branches of Bradford & Bingley were rebranded as Santander on 11 January 2010, and Abbey National plc was renamed Santander UK plc. Formula One driver Lewis Hamilton unveiled the first rebranded Santander branch that day in central London.

A further three hundred Abbey and Bradford & Bingley branches in London and south east England were rebranded that day, with branches in the rest of the United Kingdom following by the end of the month, by which time there were 1,045 Santander branches. Alliance & Leicester plc merged into the bank on 28 May 2010, and was rebranded by the end of the year.

The bank retained the London headquarters of Abbey National and renamed other regional buildings under its own name. The Abbey name was retained initially for Abbey International (now Santander Private Banking), and Abbey for Intermediaries (now Santander for Intermediaries), the division of the bank offering Abbey branded mortgages provided by Santander UK plc.

The charitable divisions of Abbey, Bradford & Bingley and Alliance & Leicester were brought together to form the Santander Foundation.

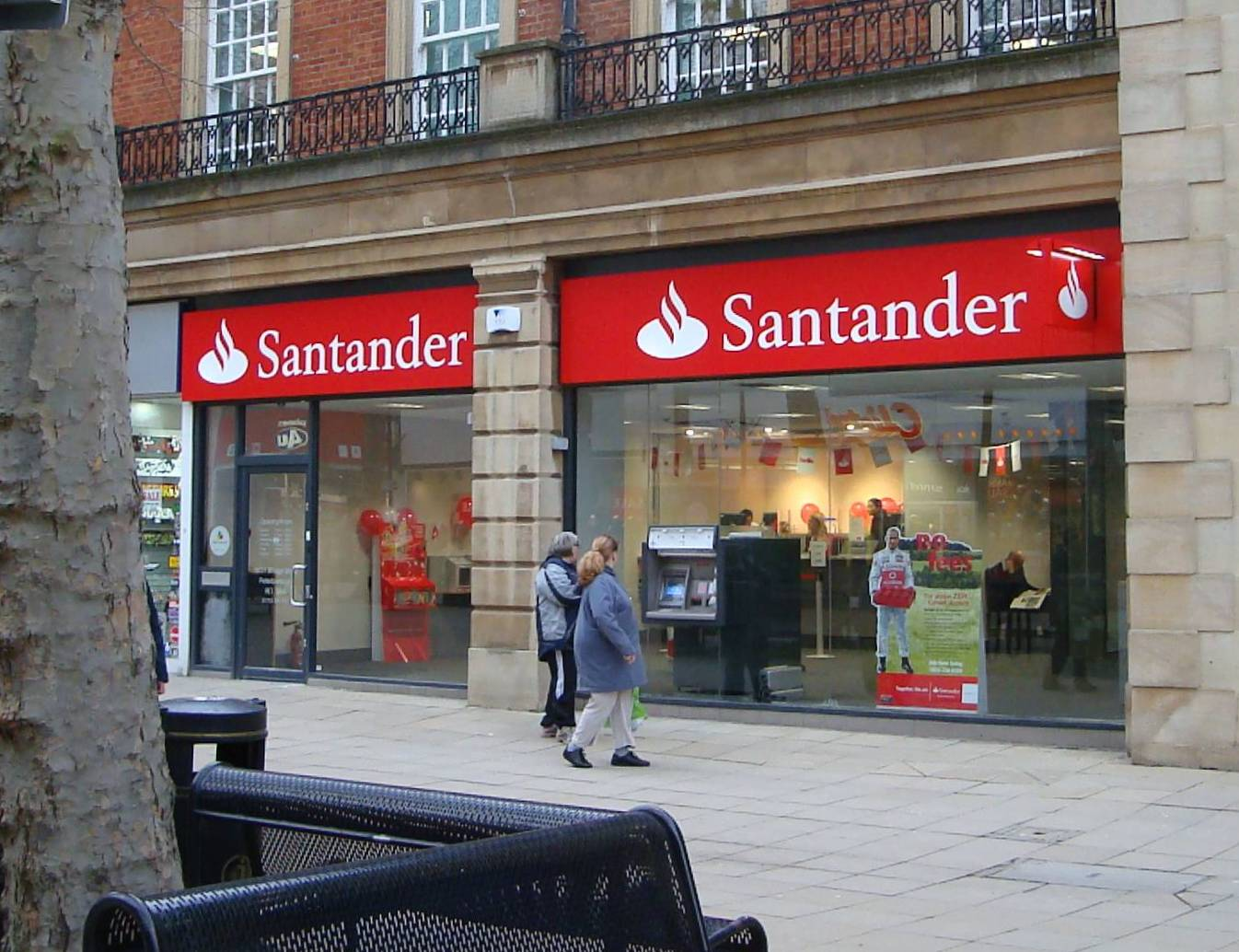
A rebranded branch of Santander in Peterborough

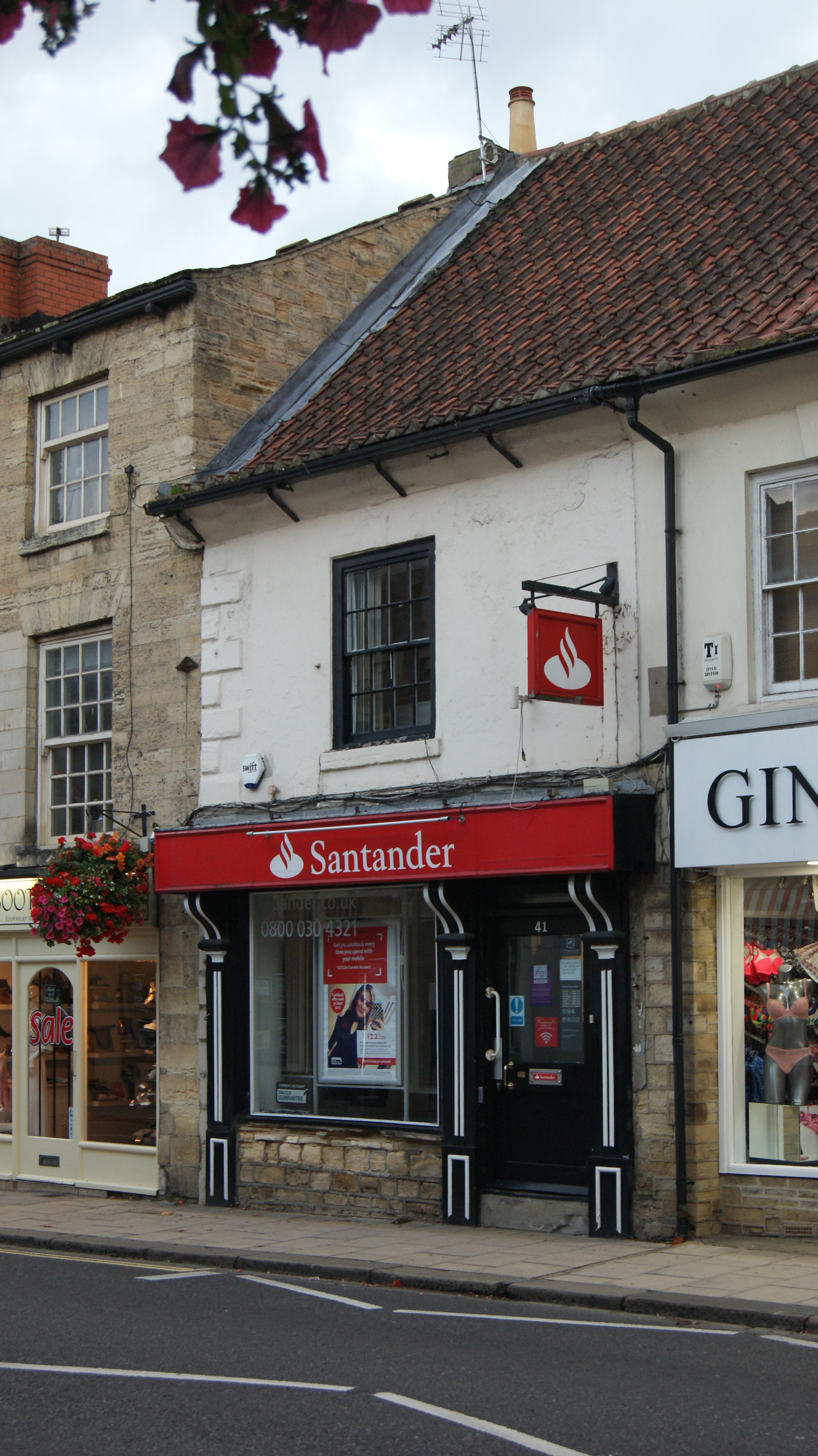
A branch of Santander in Wetherby, West Yorkshire replacing the town's previous Abbey National and Bradford and Bingley branches.

Due to the three way merger, Santander was in the unusual position of having more than one branch in many British high streets. In Northumberland Street, Newcastle upon Tyne, for example, there were three branches, which were formerly Abbey, Alliance & Leicester and Bradford & Bingley respectively.

Plymouth city centre had four branches within three hundred metres, two of which were adjacent to each other. Until December 2019, Shrewsbury had two branches of Santander in the town centre. In March 2012, the bank began to reduce the number of duplicate branches, identifying 56 that would close. Staff in the branches selected for closure were moved to other nearby branches.

Alliance & Leicester Commercial Bank merged into Santander's business banking division, Santander Corporate Banking, in July 2009.

=== 2010–2024 ===
On 9 March 2010, Santander sold the investment and asset management business James Hay to IFG Group for £35 million. Later in the year, it was confirmed on 4 August that Santander intended to purchase the branches of The Royal Bank of Scotland in England and Wales, and the branches of NatWest in Scotland as part of a divestment of the business by The Royal Bank of Scotland Group. The deal collapsed on 12 October 2012.

In October 2011, Moody's downgraded the credit rating of twelve financial firms in the United Kingdom, including Santander UK, blaming financial weakness. In June 2012, Moody rated Santander UK as being in a more financially healthy position than its parent company, Banco Santander. Less than 1% of Santander UK's business is held abroad.

Santander had frequently been rated the worst bank for customer service in the United Kingdom, although by July 2011 had sought to improve, notably by returning call centre operations to the United Kingdom from India. During 2011, the bank put aside £538m to cover claims from customers for the misselling of payment protection insurance (PPI).

In December 2012, Santander reached an agreement to sell its store card business, which includes branded cards issued for retailers including Topshop, House of Fraser and Debenhams, to SAV Credit. The sale was completed on 13 May 2013, though Santander continued to service accounts on behalf of SAV Credit until 1 April 2014.

During 2014, the bank considered an initial public offering (IPO), which was expected to be completed within two years. In November 2014, the chief executive of the Santander Group said that an IPO would not be forthcoming until market conditions improved. This view was repeated in July 2015.

In a March 2020 moneysavingexpert.com poll, customers satisfaction with the levels of customer service ranked Santander second among major high street banks.

In March 2021 the bank announced that it intended to close a further 111 UK branches by August 2021.

Between 2021 and 2022 the majority of the Bank's back office administration was outsourced to Genpact in India.

=== 2025–present ===
In January 2025, Santander addressed speculation regarding its continued presence in the United Kingdom. Recent reports had suggested that the Spanish financial institution was contemplating withdrawing from the UK market. Ana Botín, the bank's executive chairman, has publicly dismissed these claims. The speculation had been driven by reports suggesting that Santander was considering various strategic options, including a possible withdrawal, amid concerns over high operating costs and regulatory challenges in the UK. In the same month, Santander UK's chair William Vereker resigned, exposing potential cracks between the bank's Spanish parent and its executive chair Ana Botín.

The Financial Times later reported the company had rejected a bid by NatWest to acquire the bank's UK operations for £11 billion.

In July 2025, Santander reached an agreement to acquire TSB from Sabadell for £2.65 billion, subject to approval by Sabadell's shareholders. The sale completed on 30 April 2026.

In the first half of 2025, Santander UK’s specialist "Break the Spell" team was credited with preventing £3.5 million from being paid to fraudsters, primarily in cases involving romance scams and sophisticated social engineering.

The initiative, launched to address the rising threat of Authorised Push Payment (APP) fraud, involves prolonged psychological support and direct engagement with customers suspected to be under the influence of scammers. Santander stated that interventions by the team often last weeks, helping potential victims recognise fraudulent manipulation before transferring funds. Bank representatives have described the effort as crucial, given the emotional and psychological tactics commonly used in such scams. Santander has also called for industry-wide reforms and stricter mandatory rules for payment providers to better protect consumers from financial fraud.

In October 2025, it was announced that the company's chief executive, Mike Regnier, will leave the company in the first quarter of 2026.

Pedro Castro e Almeida was appointed Group Chief Risk Officer in 2026, succeeding Mahesh Aditya. Pedro previously served as CEO of Santander Portugal since 2019 and as regional head for Europe from 2023 to 2025.

Mahesh Aditya was appointed CEO of Santander UK effective March 1, 2026, succeeding Mike Regnier who stepped down in October 2025. Aditya previously served as Santander's Group Chief Risk Officer.

== Services ==
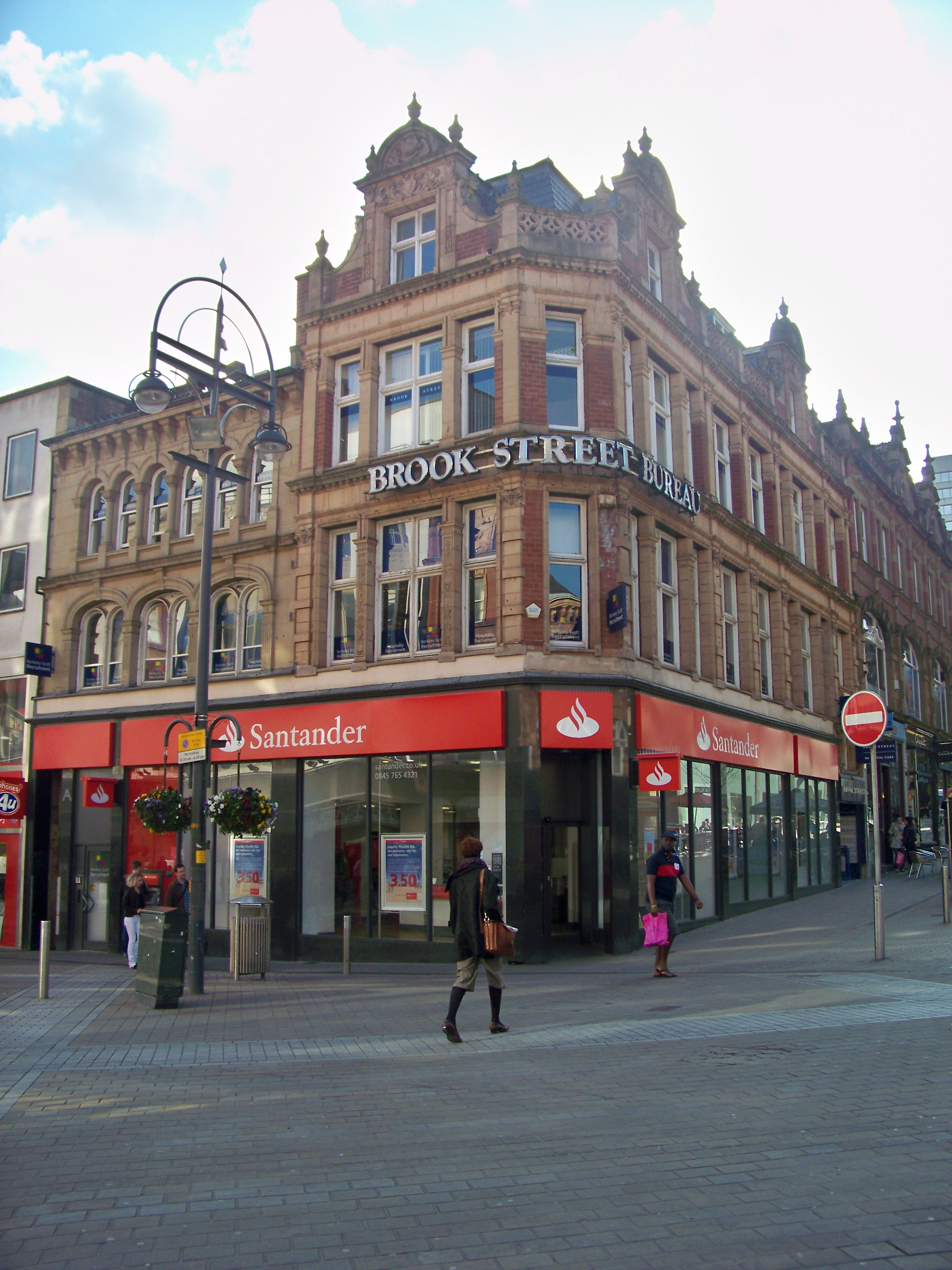
A branch of Santander on Briggate, Leeds

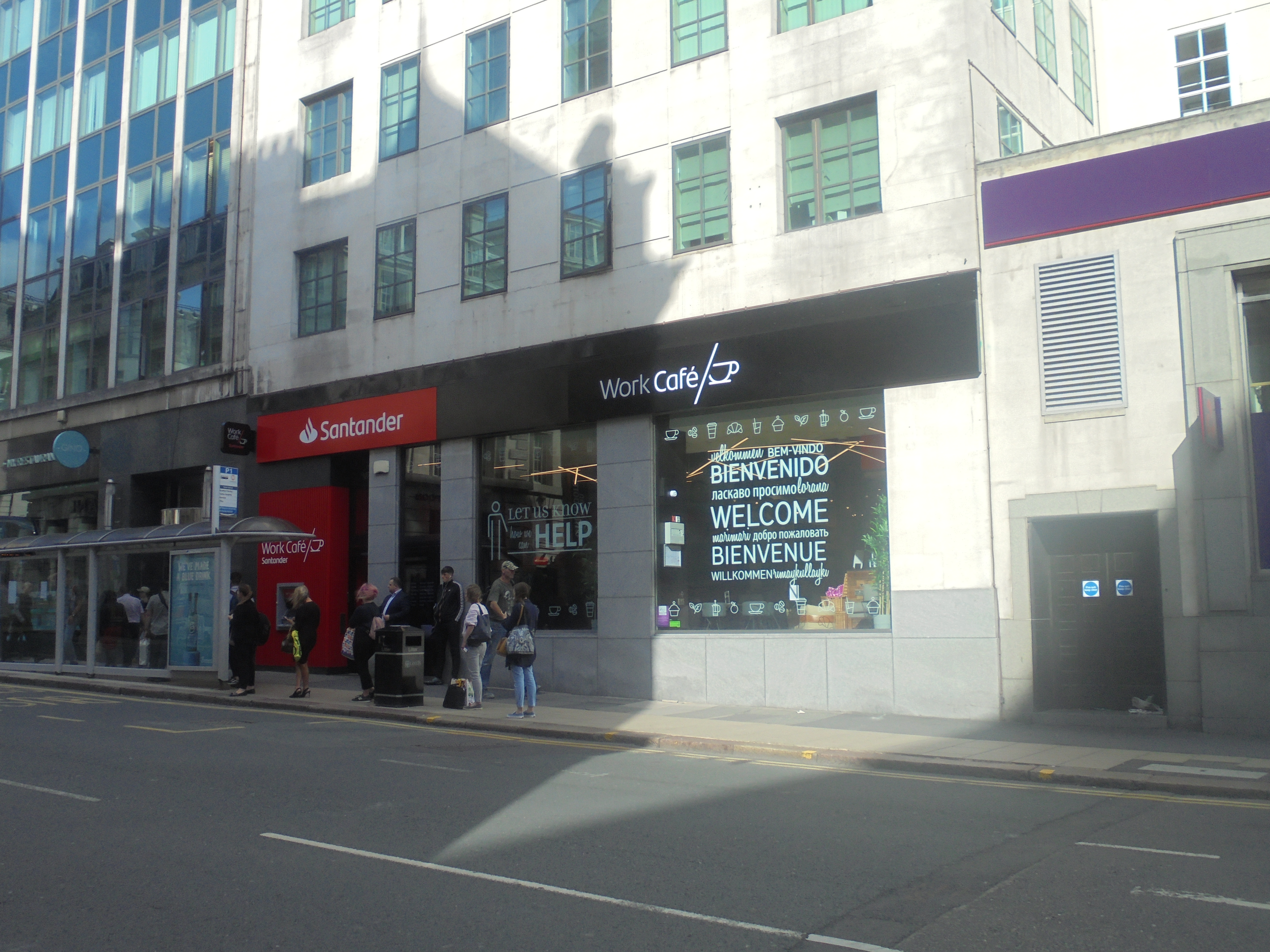
Santander Work Café on Park Row, Leeds

The bank provides a full range of personal, business and corporate accounts, including current accounts, mortgages, credit products and savings and investments. Santander operate online banking services, including mobile apps, and operate an internet only banking division branded Cahoot. Mortgages are also provided through Santander for Intermediaries, a division of the bank used by brokers. The bank's branches on the Isle of Man and Jersey have operated under the brand name of Santander International since 2016.

Santander's Corporate and Commercial Banking division operates from a number of regional business banking centres across the United Kingdom. In May 2013, Ana Botin announced plans to double the number of centres to 70 within three years. Santander UK is authorised by the Prudential Regulation Authority and regulated by both the Financial Conduct Authority and the Prudential Regulation Authority.

It is a member of the Financial Services Compensation Scheme, UK Payments Administration, Bankers' Automated Clearing Services (BACS), the Faster Payments Service, the Clearing House Automated Payment System (CHAPS), the Cheque and Credit Clearing Company, the British Bankers' Association and subscribes to the Lending Code.

Six digit account sort codes are used in the range between 09-00-xx to 09-19-xx. Sort codes for accounts formerly held by Alliance & Leicester use the range 09-01-31 to 09-01-36.

In November 2009, Santander launched the first current account in the United Kingdom without fees (including unauthorised overdrafts) for its current and future mortgage customers. In January 2010, the bank began waiving fees for customers using Santander's automated teller machines in Spain, which traditionally would incur fees for transactions in a foreign currency.

== Sponsorships and brand ambassadors ==
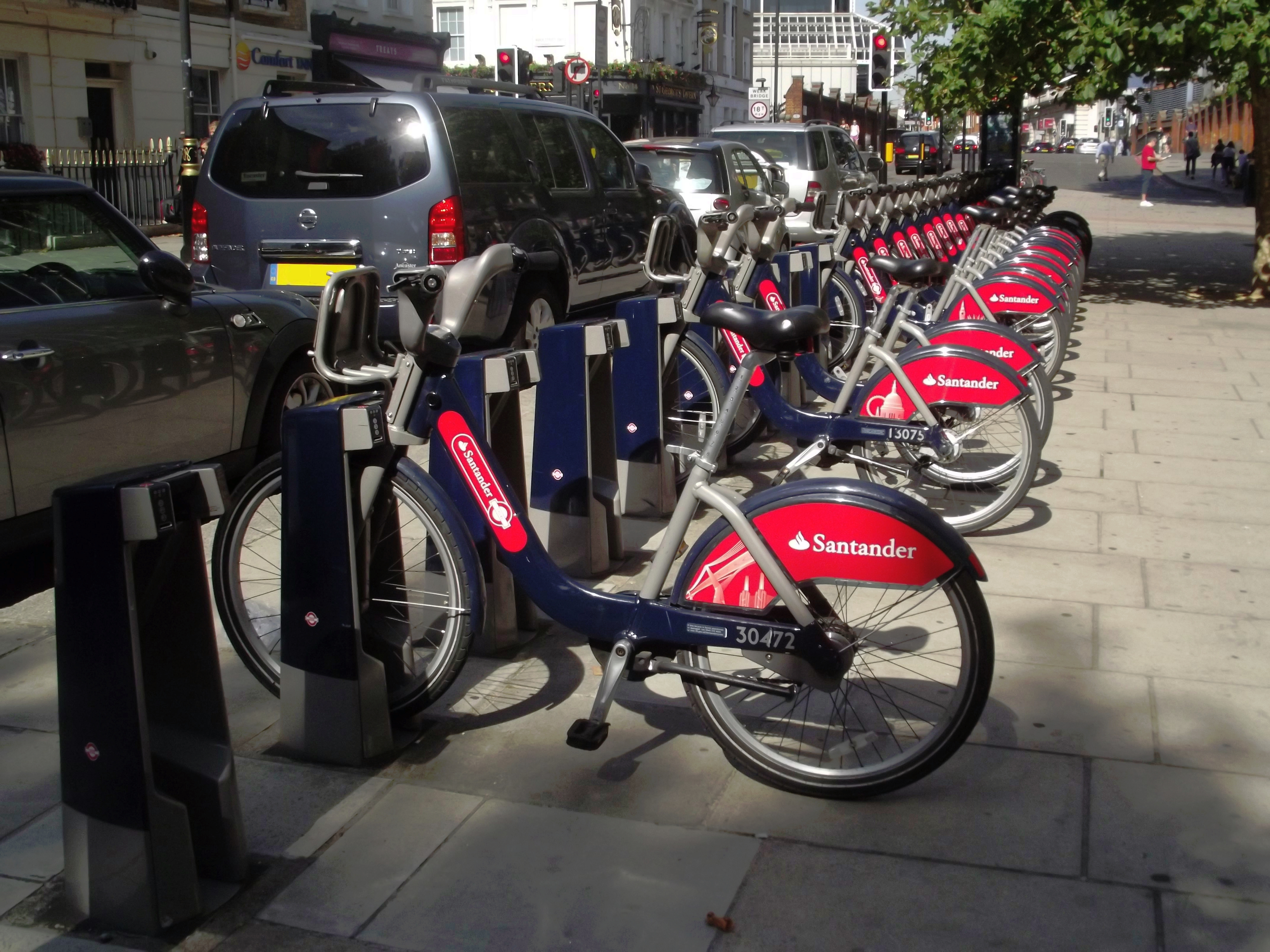
Santander-branded bicycles in London

Santander sponsored the McLaren Formula One team between 2007 and 2013. Santander said its sponsorship of McLaren had raised its brand awareness in the United Kingdom from 20 to 82 percent. The bank announced a second team sponsorship, with Scuderia Ferrari, in 2009. In 2024, Santander dropped sponsorship with Scuderia Ferrari for Williams Racing.

Golfer Rory McIlroy signed a sponsorship agreement with the bank in September 2011, and in February 2013, it was announced that British heptathlete Jessica Ennis-Hill would become a brand ambassador.

In June 2019, TV presenters Ant & Dec were announced as new brand ambassadors, appearing frequently in their television advertising campaigns. These adverts featured the pair running their own knock-off version of Santander and coming up with all sorts of impractical versions of Santander's services.

In February 2015, Santander was announced as the new sponsor of Transport for London's bicycle hire scheme, branded as Santander Cycles. Santander replaced Barclays as the title sponsor. Santander also sponsors other bicycle hire schemes in Leicester and Milton Keynes.

== See also ==
- Banking in the United Kingdom
- List of banks in the United Kingdom
