= 2018 New Year Honours =

British royal recognitions

The 2018 New Year Honours were appointments by some of the 16 Commonwealth realms to various orders and honours to recognise and reward good works by citizens of those countries. The New Year Honours were awarded as part of the New Year celebrations at the start of January and were officially announced in The London Gazette on 30 December 2017. Australia, an independent Realm, has a separate honours system and its first honours of the year, the 2018 Australia Day Honours, coincide with Australia Day on 26 January. New Zealand, also an independent Realm, has its own system of honours.

The 2018 honours list includes knighthoods for music legends Ringo Starr—which was reported by the press a week before the list was made public—and Barry Gibb. Veteran actor Hugh Laurie, who was appointed an Officer of the Order of the British Empire (OBE) in 2007, was advanced to a Commander of the Order (CBE). Former ballerina Darcey Bussell was created a Dame Commander of the Order (DBE) and Lady Antonia Fraser, author and historian, was appointed to the Order of the Companions of Honour.

The highest chivalric honour was awarded to Richard Scott, Duke of Buccleuch and Queensberry, who was appointed a Knight of the Order of the Thistle, filling the vacancy since the death of Lady Marion Fraser on 25 December 2016. The ancient order is reserved for Scots and is limited to 16 ordinary members.

The recipients of honours are displayed as they were styled before their new honour and arranged by the country (in order of precedence) whose ministers advised The Queen on the appointments, then by honour with grades i.e. Knight/Dame Grand Cross, Knight/Dame Commander etc. and then divisions i.e. Civil, Diplomatic and Military as appropriate.

== United Kingdom ==
Below are the individuals appointed by Elizabeth II in her right as Queen of the United Kingdom with honours within her own gift and with the advice of the Government for other honours.

=== The Most Ancient and Most Noble Order of the Thistle ===
==== Knight of the Order of the Thistle (KT) ====
- His Grace Richard Walter John Montagu Douglas Scott, The Duke of Buccleuch and Queensberry KBE

=== Knight Bachelor ===
- Professor Timothy John Besley, CBE, London School of Economics and Political Science. For services to Economics and Public Policy.
- Graham Stuart Brady, MP, Member of Parliament for Altrincham and Sale West. For political and public service.
- Christopher Robert Chope, OBE, MP, Member of Parliament for Christchurch. For political and public service.
- The Right Honourable Nicholas William Peter Clegg. For political and public service.
- Geoffrey Robert Clifton-Brown, MP, Member of Parliament for the Cotswolds. For political and public service.
- Professor John Kevin Curtice, FBA, FRSE, Professor of Politics, University of Strathclyde and Senior Research Fellow, National Centre for Social Research (NatCen). For services to the Social Sciences and Politics.
- Barry Alan Crompton Gibb, CBE, Singer, songwriter and record producer. For services to music and charity.
- Anthony John Habgood, Chairman, Court of the Bank of England. For services to UK Industry.
- Mark Phillip Hendrick, MP, Member of Parliament for Preston. For parliamentary and political service.
- The Right Honourable Lindsay Harvey Hoyle, MP, Member of Parliament for Chorley. For parliamentary and political services.
- Richard Julian Long, CBE, Artist and sculptor. For services to Art.
- Craig Thomas Mackey, QPM, Deputy Commissioner, Metropolitan Police Service. For services to Policing.
- Timothy David Melville-Ross, CBE, Chair, Higher Education Funding Council for England. For services to Higher Education.
- Michael Andrew Bridge Morpurgo, OBE, Author. For services to Literature and charity.
- Kenneth Aphunezi Olisa, OBE. For services to Business and Philanthropy.
- Dr. Andrew Charles Parmley, lately Lord Mayor of London. For services to Music, Education and Civic Engagement.
- Professor Bernard Walter Silverman, lately Chief Scientific Adviser, Home Office. For public service and services to Science.
- Professor Robert Stephen John Sparks, CBE, Professorial Research Fellow, University of Bristol. For services to Volcanology and Geology.
- Richard Starkey (Ringo Starr), MBE, Musician. For services to Music.
- Professor Terence John Stephenson, Chair, General Medical Council. For services to Healthcare and Children's Health Services.
- Very Reverend Professor Iain Richard Torrance, Pro-Chancellor, University of Aberdeen. For services to Higher Education and Theology.
- Edward Astley (John) Troup, lately Executive Chair, HM Revenue and Customs. For public service to Taxpayers and the Tax System.
- Alan John Tuckett, OBE, Professor of Education, University of Wolverhampton. For services to Education, Particularly Adult Learning.
- Alan Thorpe Richard Wood, CBE, Lately Corporate Director, Children and Young People's Services, London Borough of Hackney. For services to Children's Social Care and Education.
- Dr. William Thompson Wright, CBE, Founder, Wrightbus Ltd. For services to the Economy and the Bus Industry.

=== The Most Honourable Order of the Bath ===
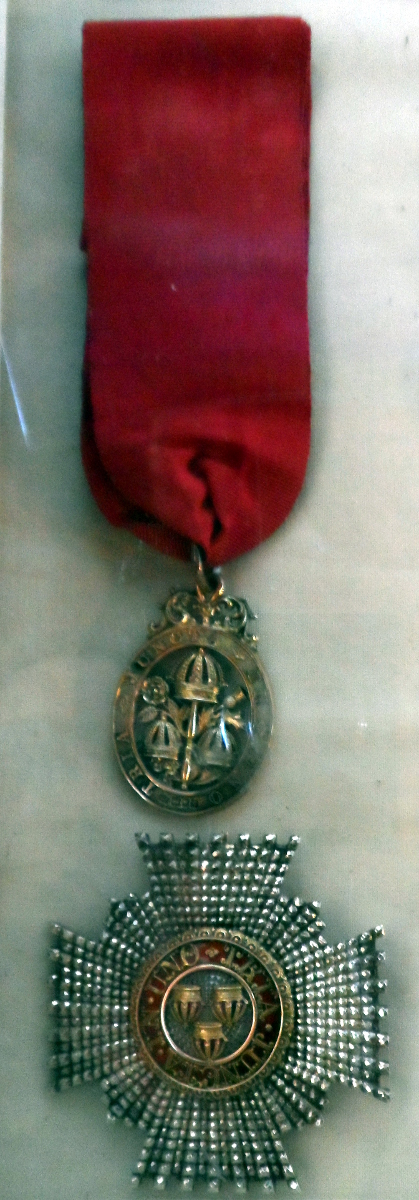
Star and neck badge of a Knight Commander of the civil division of the Order of the Bath

==== Knight Grand Cross of the Order of the Bath (GCB) ====
- The Right Honourable Christopher Edward Wollaston MacKenzie Geidt, Lord Geidt GCVO KCB OBE PC – Lately private secretary to HM the Queen. For public service.

==== Knight Commander of the Order of the Bath (KCB) ====
Military Division

Royal Navy

- Vice Admiral Simon Jonathan Woodcock OBE

Civil Division

- Philip McDougall Rutnam – Permanent Secretary, Home Office. For public service.

==== Companion of the Order of the Bath (CB) ====
Military Division

Royal Navy

- Rear Admiral Keith Edward Blount OBE

Army

- Major General Angus Stuart James Fay
- Acting Lieutenant General Ivan Hooper

Royal Air Force

- Air Vice-Marshal The Honourable Richard John Martin Broadbridge QHS
- Air Vice-Marshal (The Venerable) Jonathan Paul Michael Chaffey QHC

Civil Division

- Raymond John Long – Programme Director, Department for Work and Pensions Digital Group. For services to government and the public sector.
- Howard Orme – Chief Financial and Operating Officer, Department For Education. For public services especially to finance and building delivery capability.
- Nicholas Proctor Perry – For services to the criminal justice system in Northern Ireland.
- Dr. David Prout – lately Director General, HS2. For services to transport.
- Timothy David Rossington – lately Finance Director, Department for Digital, Culture, Media and Sport. For public service.
- Stephen John Charles Speed – Director, Civil Nuclear and Resilience, Department for Business, Energy and Industrial Strategy. For services to the oil and gas industry.

Diplomatic Service and Overseas List

- Marcus Boyd Willett OBE – Director general, Foreign and Commonwealth Office. For services to national security.

=== The Most Distinguished Order of Saint Michael and Saint George ===
==== Knight Grand Cross of the Order of St Michael and St George (GCMG) ====
Diplomatic Service and Overseas List

- Sir Mark Lyall Grant KCMG – For services to UK foreign and national security policy.

==== Knights Commander of the Order of St Michael and St George (KCMG / DCMG) ====
Diplomatic Service and Overseas List

- The Honourable Joseph John Bossano – Member of Parliament and Minister, former Chief Minister. For services to Gibraltar.
- Dominick John Chilcott CMG – Former HM Ambassador, Dublin, Ireland. For services to British foreign policy.
- Paul John Mahoney – UK Judge of the European Court of Human Rights in Strasbourg. For services to international justice.
- Mark Sedwill CMG – National security adviser and former permanent secretary at the Home Office. For services to UK national security.

==== Companion of the Order of St Michael and St George (CMG) ====
- Helen Patricia Sharman OBE – For services to science and technology educational outreach.

Diplomatic Service and Overseas List

- Duncan Brierton Allan MBE – Research analyst, Eastern Europe and Central Asia directorate, Foreign and Commonwealth Office. For services to supporting and informing British government policy towards Russia.
- Francis Raymond Baker OBE – Lately HM Ambassador, Baghdad, Iraq. For services to British foreign policy and UK/Iraq relations.
- Alison Mary Blake – High Commissioner, Dhaka, Bangladesh. For services to British foreign and security policy.
- Terry Callaghan – Professor of Arctic ecology and director, University of Sheffield. For services to advancing knowledge and international collaboration in Arctic science.
- Diana June Nelson OBE – Head of Health and Welfare International, Human Resources Directorate, Foreign and Commonwealth Office. For services to the welfare of staff and families working for the British government overseas.
- Quentin James Kitson Phillips – Director, Foreign and Commonwealth Office. For services to British foreign policy.
- Dr. William George Stirling – lately Director General, European Synchrotron Radiation Facility and lately Director Institut Laue–Langevin, Grenoble, France. For services to British science and international science collaboration.

=== The Royal Victorian Order ===
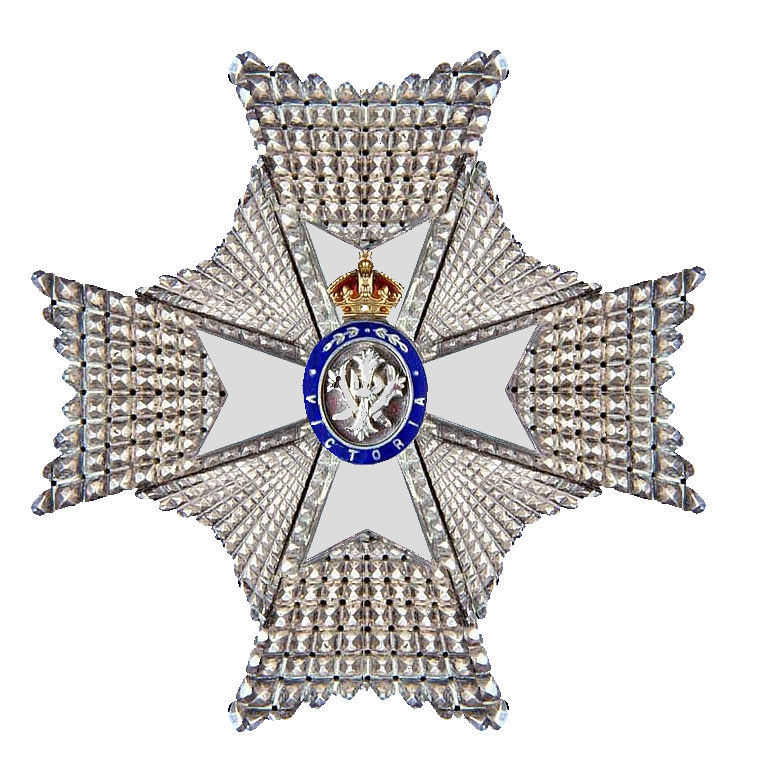
Insignia of a Knight / Dame Commander of the Royal Victorian Order

==== Knight / Dame Commander of the Royal Victorian Order (KCVO / DCVO) ====
- Denis Fitzgerald Desmond CBE, Lord-Lieutenant of County Londonderry.
- Marcus James O'Lone CVO, Land agent, Sandringham Estate.
- Mary, Lady Carew Pole CVO, Lady in waiting to the Princess Royal.
- Kathrin Elizabeth Thomas CVO JP, Lord-Lieutenant of Mid-Glamorgan.

==== Commander of the Royal Victorian Order (CVO) ====
- Donald Angus Cameron of Lochiel, Lord-Lieutenant of Inverness-shire.
- Joan Christie, OBE, Lord-Lieutenant of County Antrim.
- Guy Wyndham Nial Hamilton Clark, Lord-Lieutenant of Renfrewshire.
- Lieutenant General Arundell David Leakey, CMG, CBE, Formerly Gentleman Usher of the Black Rod.
- Charlotte Elizabeth Manley, LVO, OBE, Chapter clerk, College of St George.
- Nuala Patricia McGourty, LVO, Retail director, Royal Collection Enterprises Ltd.
- Theresa-Mary Morton, LVO, Head of exhibitions, Royal Collection Trust.
- Dame Janet Olive Trotter, DBE, Lord-Lieutenant of Gloucestershire.
- Stephen Gregory Wallace, formerly Secretary to the Governor General of Canada and Herald Chancellor.
- Galen Willard Gordon Weston, OC, OOnt. For services to the Prince's Charities, Canada.

==== Lieutenant of the Royal Victorian Order (LVO) ====
- Anthony Richard Bird – Chief Pilot, the Queen's Helicopter Flight
- Alexander Christopher De Montfort MVO – Assistant comptroller, Lord Chamberlain's Office
- Brian Edward Ford MVO – The Duke of York's Household
- Amanda Jane Foster MVO – Senior communications officer, Household of the Prince of Wales and the Duchess of Cornwall
- Nicholas John Henderson – Trainer of the Queen's Racehorses
- Commodore Laurence Charles Hopkins RN – formerly Gentleman Usher to the Queen
- John Lynes MBE – Private secretary's office, Royal Household
- Justin Rupert John Hainault Mundy – Senior Director, the Prince of Wales's International Sustainability Unit
- Neil Alexander Wilson MVO – Head of IT operations, Royal Household

==== Member of the Royal Victorian Order (MVO) ====
- Evelyn Margaret Beattie – formerly Clerk to the Lieutenancy of County Armagh
- Lieutenant Commander James Alexander Kennedy Benbow RN – formerly equerry to the Duke of Cambridge
- Peregrine David Bruce-Mitford – Gilding Conservator, Royal Collection Trust
- Sergeant Stephen Collingwood – Metropolitan Police. For services to royalty protection.
- Inspector Rodney Paul Feichtinger – Metropolitan Police. For services to royalty protection.
- Emma Elizabeth Goodey – Digital Engagement Manager, Royal Household
- Gillian Harding – formerly Executive Assistant to the Private Secretary to the Queen
- Karen Louise Lawson – Picture Library Manager, Royal Collection Trust
- Simon Edward Lloyd – Systems Manager, Household of the Earl and Countess of Wessex
- Ian John Miles – Senior Manager, Specialist Operations, Dyfed Powys Police
- Geoffrey Charles Munn OBE – Managing director, Wartski
- Jacqueline Hope Newbold – Personal Assistant, the Queen's Dressers
- John Revill RVM – Formerly the Duke of York's Household
- Katherine Charlotte Scully – For services to the household of the Prince of Wales and the Duchess of Cornwall.
- Paul Eric Southwell RVM – Manager, Sandringham House
- Clive Anthony Stevens – Messenger Sergeant Major, the Queen's Body Guard of the Yeomen of the Guard
- Inspector Douglas Ian Thompson – Metropolitan Police. For services to royalty protection.
- Audrey Williams – For services to the Lieutenancy of Dyfed.
- John David Williams MBE – Formerly clerk to the Lieutenancy of West Sussex

To be an Honorary Member

- Rachel Gwendoline Leocadia Murat – Stud groom, Polhampton Stud Farm

=== Royal Victorian Medal (RVM) ===
Royal Victorian Medal (Gold)

- Stephen Henry Ronald Marshall MVO RVM – Yeoman of the Glass and China Pantry, Royal Household

Bar to the Royal Victorian Medal (Silver)

- Paul Alexander Lawrence RVM – Tractor and machinery operator, Crown Estate, Windsor

Royal Victorian Medal (Silver)

- Philip Anthony Collins – Fire Safety and Access Officer, Buckingham Palace
- John Anthony Denton – Yeoman Bed Goer, the Queen's Body Guard of the Yeomen of the Guard
- Henry Melbourne Everist – Warden, Windsor Castle
- Alan Campbell Haggarty – formerly dining room assistant, Royal Household
- Alan Richard Parry – Semi-state harness cleaner and assistant to the stores manager, Royal Mews
- Barry Lyndon Jacob Shrubb – Deputy Head Chauffeur (Operations), Royal Household

=== The Most Excellent Order of the British Empire ===
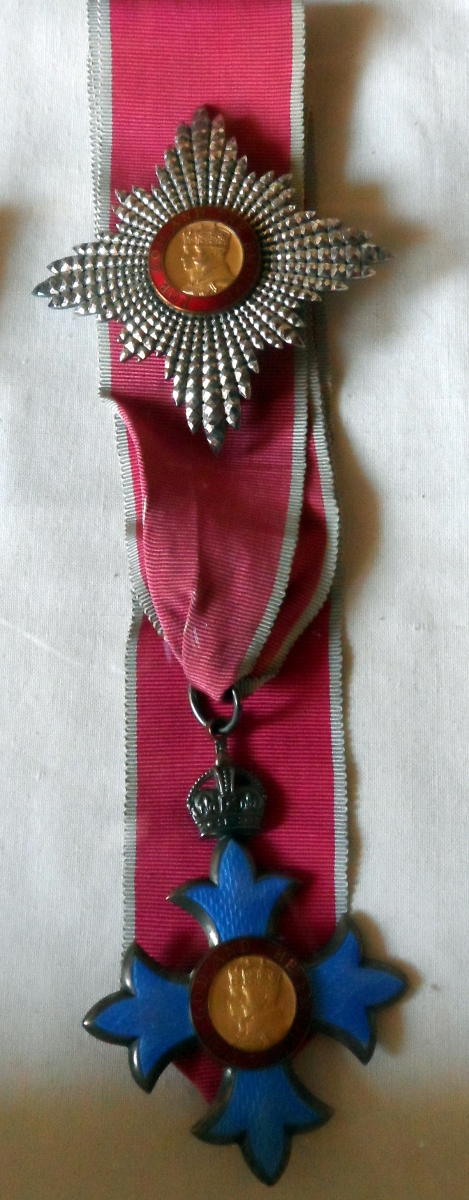
Insignia of a Knight Commander of the Order of the British Empire

==== Knight / Dame Grand Cross of the Order of the British Empire (GBE) ====
Civil Division

- Sir Keith (David) Peters – For services to the advancement of medical science.

==== Knight / Dame Commander of the Order of the British Empire (KBE / DBE) ====
Military Division

Civil Division

- Professor Janet Patricia Beer, Vice-Chancellor, University of Liverpool. For services to Higher Education and Equality.
- Darcey Andrea Bussell CBE. For services to Dance.
- Professor Hilary Anne Chapman CBE, Chief Nurse, Sheffield Teaching Hospitals NHS Foundation Trust. For services to Nursing.
- Jacqueline Lesley Daniel, Chief Executive, University Hospitals of Morecambe Bay NHS Foundation Trust. For services to Healthcare.
- Professor Pratibha Laxman Gai-Boyes, Professor and Chair of Electron Microscopy, University of York. For services to Chemical Sciences and Technology.
- The Right Honourable Cheryl Elise Kendall Gillan MP, Member of Parliament for Chesham and Amersham. For political and public service.
- Vivian Yvonne Hunt, Managing Partner for UK and Ireland, McKinsey and Company. For services to the Economy and to Women in Business.
- Clare Lucy Marx CBE, Lately President, Royal College of Surgeons. For services to Surgery in the NHS.
- Angela Mary Pedder OBE, Lately Chief Executive, Devon Success Regime and Sustainability and Transformation Plan. For services to Healthcare.
- Susan Ilene, Lady Rice CBE. For services to Business, the Arts and charity in Scotland.
- Christine Ryan, lately Chief Inspector, Independent Schools Inspectorate. For services to Education.
- Rosemary Anne Squire OBE, Co-founder, the Ambassador Theatre Group Ltd. For services to Theatre and Philanthropy.
- Catherine Lilian Warwick CBE, Lately Chief Executive, Royal College of Midwives. For services to Midwifery.

==== Commander of the Order of the British Empire (CBE) ====
Military Division

Royal Navy

- Commodore Ross Albon OBE
- Commodore Ian Shipperley
- Rear Admiral Richard Stokes
- Commodore Phillip James Titterton OBE

Army

- Brigadier Alastair James Aitken OBE
- Acting Brigadier Barry William Bennett OBE
- Brigadier Iain Graham Harrison OBE
- Brigadier John Henry Ridge

Royal Air Force

- Group Captain Richard Andrew Davies
- Air Commodore Alan Kenneth Gillespie
- Group Captain (now Air Commodore) Michael John Smeath MBE

Civil Division

- Professor Stuart Ryan Ball. For services to political history.
- Paul David Baumann, Chief Financial Officer, NHS England. For services to NHS financial management.
- Professor Nevin Fraser David Bell. For services to economics and public policy.
- Professor Norman David Black. For services to higher education, science and the voluntary sector.
- Josephine Catherine Boaden Totton, Chief Executive, Northern Housing Consortium. For services to housing providers in the North of England.
- Professor Timothy William Roy Briggs, Consultant Orthopaedic Surgeon, Royal National Orthopaedic Hospital NHS Trust. For services to the surgical profession.
- Dale Graham Bywater, Executive Regional Managing Director for Midlands and East, NHS Improvement. For services to NHS patients and taxpayers.
- Professor Joy Carter, Vice-Chancellor, University of Winchester. For services to higher education.
- David Alan Clarke, Chief Executive, Assured Food Standards. For services to the British food and farming industry.
- Blondel Bernadette Rosceilia Cluff, Member, Royal Mint Advisory Committee and Chief Executive, West India Committee. For services to numismatic design and the Caribbean community in the UK and abroad.
- Clare Joanne Connor OBE Director of Women's Cricket, England and Wales Cricket Board. For services to cricket.
- Joyce Evelyn Cook OBE For services to sport and accessibility.
- Jilly Cooper OBE Author and journalist. For services to literature and charity.
- Professor Diane Coyle OBE For services to economics and the public understanding of economics.
- Patrick Lorne Crerar. For services to the hospitality industry in Scotland and to charity.
- Professor Martyn Christopher Davies, lately Professor of Biomedical Surface Chemistry, University of Nottingham. For services to pharmacy and pharmaceutical sciences.
- Thomas Auguste Read Delay, Chief Executive, the Carbon Trust. For services to sustainability in business.
- Sean Nicholas Dennehey, Deputy Chief Executive, Intellectual Property Office. For services to intellectual property.
- Professor Caroline Dive, professor of cancer pharmacology and deputy director, Cancer Research UK Manchester Institute. For services to cancer research.
- Professor Christl Ann Donnelly, professor of statistical epidemiology, Imperial College London. For services to epidemiology and the control of infectious diseases.
- Professor Michele Karen Dougherty, Professor of Space Physics, Imperial College London. For services to UK physical science research.
- Judith Doyle, Principal and chief executive officer, Gateshead College. For services to education and skills in the North East.
- Janette Anita Durbin, Director, Civil Service Talent. For services to diversity in the senior civil service.
- Elizabeth Lucy Dymond, Finance director, the Charity for Civil Servants. For public service.
- David Robert Earnshaw, chair, Outwood Grange Academies Trust. For services to education.
- Professor Richard Ludlow English, Pro-Vice-Chancellor and professor of politics, Queen's University Belfast. For services to the understanding of modern-day terrorism and political history.
- Dr. Phillip Andrew Evans, Head, DFID Somalia, Department for International Development. For services to humanitarian relief.
- Peter Kenrick Florence MBE Co-founder and director, Hay Festival. For services to literature and charity.
- Professor Jonathan Freeman-Attwood, Principal, Royal Academy of Music. For services to music.
- Hilary Mary Garratt, Director of Nursing, NHS England. For services to nursing and the safeguarding of vulnerable people.
- Michael Anthony Giannasi QPM Chairman, Welsh Ambulance Services NHS Trust. For services to the NHS.
- Professor Simon John Gibson OBE Chief executive, Wesley Clover Corporation. For services to the economy in Wales.
- Martin Keith Green, Chief executive and director, Hull UK City of Culture. For services to the arts in Hull.
- Paul Gregg, Professor of Economic and Social Policy, University of Bath. For services to children and social mobility.
- Andrew Melvin Hamilton. For services to government and to charitable fundraising.
- Jane Sarah Hamlyn. For services to philanthropy and the arts.
- Dr. Demis Hassabis, co-founder and chief executive officer, DeepMind. For services to science and technology.
- Dave Christopher Hill, executive director for Social Care and Education, Essex County Council. For services to children's social care.
- Dawn Elysea Hill, chairman, Black Cultural Archives. For services to culture.
- Lilian Hochhauser. For services to the arts and cultural relations.
- Professor Karen Margaret Holford, Deputy Vice Chancellor, Cardiff University. For services to engineering and the advancement of women in science and engineering.
- Denise Susan Horsfall, Work Services Director, Department For Work and Pensions. For services to welfare in Scotland.
- Stephen William Howlett DL Group chief executive, Peabody. For services to housing.
- Professor Katherine Jane Humphries FBA Professor of economic history, University of Oxford. For services to social science and economic history.
- Raymond Joseph James, lately President, Association of Directors of Adult Social Services, London Borough of Enfield. For services to adult social services.
- Shaun Kingsbury, Chief Executive, Green Investment Bank. For services to the UK Green economy.
- Susan Hampshire, Lady Kulukundis OBE Actress. For services to drama and to charity.
- James Hugh Calum Laurie OBE Actor. For services to drama.
- Professor Richard James Lilford, Professor of Public Health, University of Warwick. For services to health research.
- Dr. Suzannah Claire Lishman, Consultant Histopathologist, North West Anglia NHS Foundation Trust. For services to pathology.
- Dr. Robin Howard Lovell-Badge, Senior Group Leader, Francis Crick Institute. For services to genetics, stem cell research and the public understanding of science.
- James Brown Martin, lately Scottish Public Services Ombudsman. For services to the Scottish public sector.
- Professor Maureen Lesley McAra, Professor of penology and assistant principal for community engagement, University of Edinburgh. For services to criminology.
- Anne McGaughrin, Legal Director for Department for Education, Government Legal Department. For services to law and order in the public sector.
- Julia Kathleen Nancy McKenzie, Actress, singer and director. For services to drama.
- David Robert Michael Melding. For political and public service.
- David Robert Meller, Founder, Meller Educational Trust and chair, National Apprenticeship Ambassadors Network. For services to education.
- Nigel John Mills, co-founder and chairman, the Lakes Distillery. For services to entrepreneurship in the North East and Cumbria.
- Professor Andrew David Morris FRSE Lately chief scientist (health), Scottish government and vice-principal (data science), University of Edinburgh. For services to science in Scotland.
- Dr. Joseph John Morrow, President, Mental Health Tribunal for Scotland. For public service to mental health.
- John Frederick Nelson DL Lately chairman, Lloyd's of London. For services to the global promotion of British business and to diversity in the workplace.
- Professor Philip Arthur Nelson, chief executive officer, Engineering and Physical Sciences Research Council and chair, Research Councils UK. For services to UK engineering and science.
- Peter Nichols, Playwright. For services to drama.
- Dr. Anne Louise Rainsberry, Regional Director, London, NHS England. For services to the NHS.
- Norma Redfearn. For public and community service in Tyneside.
- Hilary Marion Ruth Reynolds, executive director, Research Councils UK. For services to policy and research.
- Howard Charles Fraser Riddle, lately Senior District Judge (Chief Magistrate) for England and Wales. For services to the administration of justice.
- Timothy John Rix, Group Managing Director, J R Rix and Sons Ltd. For services to the economy and regeneration in the Humber Region.
- Andrew Ogilvie Robertson OBE Chairman, LAR Housing Trust. For services to veterans, healthcare and affordable housing in Glasgow and the West of Scotland.
- Jacqueline de Rojas, President, techUK. For services to international trade in the technology industry.
- Professor Philip Alexander Routledge OBE Consultant physician, Llandough Hospital, Cardiff and professor emeritus of clinical pharmacology, Cardiff University. For services to medicine.
- Kevin Ian Sadler, Director, Courts and Tribunals Development, HM Courts and Tribunals Service. For services to the administration of justice.
- Nuzhat Saleh Gould, assistant director, Directorate of Legal Services, Metropolitan Police Service. For services to policing.
- Alan Scott, deputy director, North West Prisons. For services to HM prison and probation service and to the community in the North West.
- Dr. Siu Hung Robin Sham, Global Long Span and Speciality Bridges Director, AECOM. For services to the civil engineering profession.
- Alexandra Shulman OBE Lately editor, British Vogue. For services to fashion journalism.
- Amanda Skelton, Chief Executive, Redcar and Cleveland Council. For services to the Redcar and Tees Valley economy.
- Alison Helen Stanley. For services to the creation and leadership of civil service employee policy, with a particular focus on improving and implementing workforce policies.
- Christopher Richard Stein OBE Chef and restaurateur. For services to the economy.
- David James Edwin Stephens, Director of Resources (Army), HM Armed Forces, Ministry of Defence. For services to defence.
- Andrea Mary Sutcliffe, Chief Inspector of Adult Social Care, Care Quality Commission. For services to adult social care in England.
- Robert William Ashburnham Swannell, Non-Executive Chairman, UK Government Investment. For services to the public, retail and financial sectors.
- Joanna Kate Swinson. For political and public service.
- Benjamin John Paget Thomson, lately chairman, Board of Trustees, National Galleries of Scotland. For services to arts and culture in Scotland.
- Anthony Edward Timpson. For public and parliamentary service.
- Dana Rachel Pressman Tobak, chief executive officer and managing director, Hyperoptic. For services to the digital economy.
- Veronica Judith Colleton Wadley Bower, chair, Arts Council London. For services to the arts.
- Anthony James Walker DL Deputy managing director, Toyota Manufacturing (UK) Ltd. For services to the motor industry.
- Deborah Anne Walsh, Deputy Head of Counter Terrorism, Special Crime and Counter Terrorism Division, Crown Prosecution Service. For services to law and order.
- Dr. Lindsey Janet Whiterod OBE Chief executive, South Tyneside College. For services to education and the community in South Tyneside.
- Nick Gerard Peter Whitfield, Chief Executive, Achieving for Children and Children's Services and lately Commissioner, Sunderland and Reading. For services to children.
- Professor Ngaire Tui Woods, Dean, Blavatnik School of Government, Oxford University. For services to higher education and public policy.

==== Officer of the Order of the British Empire (OBE) ====
Military Division

Royal Navy

- Commander Johanna Deakin
- Commodore David Graham Elford
- Captain Clayton Richard Allan Fisher
- Lieutenant Colonel Damian Jon Huntingford, Royal Marines
- Commander Peter John Pipkin
- Commander Philip Charles Richardson
- Captain Stephen John Thompson

Army

- Lieutenant Colonel Matthew Richard Baker, the Rifles
- Colonel Nicholas Hugh De Renzy Channer
- Lieutenant Colonel Richard George Hallett, Royal Logistic Corps
- Warrant Officer Class 1 Glenn John Haughton, Grenadier Guards
- Lieutenant Colonel Rachel Samantha Hawes, Royal Army Medical Corps, Army Reserve
- Colonel Neill Allan Page
- Lieutenant Colonel Rhodri David Phillip, Royal Army Medical Corps
- Lieutenant Colonel Victoria Caroline Reid MBE Royal Logistic Corps
- Colonel Michael Peter Sykes
- Lieutenant Colonel Geoffrey John Whatmough, Royal Regiment of Artillery

Royal Air Force

- Group Captain Andrew Edgar Battye
- Wing Commander Sean Donoghue
- Wing Commander Darryn George Rawlins
- Group Captain Roland Stephen Smith

Civil Division

- Christine Abbott, Chief Executive Officer, The Education Alliance and Executive Principal, South Hunsley School and Sixth Form College, Melton. For services to education.
- Irene Adams, Adviser to the Chair, Green Investment Bank. For services to the UK Green economy.
- Raja Mohammed Adil, Chairman, the Adil Group. For services to business, job creation and charity.
- Sarah Alexander, Chief Executive and Artistic Director, National Youth Orchestra. For services to music.
- Peter Mark (Marc) Almond, Singer-songwriter, musician and campaigner. For services to arts and culture.
- Sophie Andrews, Chief Executive, Silver Line. For services to older people.
- Patricia Ann Armstrong, Chief Executive Officer, Association of Chief Officers of Scottish Voluntary Organisations. For services to voluntary organisations.
- Dr. William Stewart Arnold, Principal Mechanical Specialist Inspector, Health and Safety Executive. For services to industry health and safety.
- Professor James Arthur, Professor of Education and Civic Engagement, University of Birmingham. For services to education.
- Jarnail Singh Athwal, Founder and Managing Director, Premier Decorations Ltd. For services to business and charity.
- Professor Jeremy Bagg, Head of Dental School, University of Glasgow. For services to dental education.
- Dr. Tina Lorraine Barsby, Chief Executive and Director, National Institute of Agricultural Botany. For services to UK agricultural science and biotechnology.
- Professor Clive Behagg, lately Vice-Chancellor, University of Chichester. For services to higher education and economic regeneration.
- Professor Derek Bell, President, the Royal College of Physicians of Edinburgh. For services to unscheduled care and quality improvement.
- Dr. Jacqueline Bene, Chief Executive, Bolton NHS Foundation Trust. For services to healthcare.
- Pamela Birch, Executive Principal, Hambleton Primary Academy and Deputy Chief Executive Officer, Fylde Coast Academy Trust. For services to education.
- Nilufer Von Bismarck, Head Financial Institutions Group and Equity Capital Markets, Slaughter and May. For services to financial services.
- Professor Charanjt Bountra, Professor of Translational Medicine, University of Oxford. For services to translational medical research.
- Dr. Brian Robert Bowsher, Chief Executive, Science and Technology Facilities Council. For services to international and national metrology.
- James Gerard Boyle, Head of Infrastructure Architecture, Telford, HM Revenue and Customs. For services to taxpayers and government modernisation.
- Matthew Boyle, President and Chief Executive, Sevcon. For services to engineering and skills.
- Dr. Fiona Janet Bradley, Director, the Fruitmarket Gallery. For services to the arts.
- Stephen Brady, Leader, Hull City Council. For services to local government.
- Professor Karen Bryan, lately Pro Vice-Chancellor, Regional Engagement and Dean, Faculty of Health and Wellbeing, Sheffield Hallam University. For services to higher education.
- Thomas Lionel Ashley Burgess. For services to charity, the RNLI and business.
- David George Harmer Buttery, lately Deputy Director, High Speed Rail Legislation and Environment, Department for Transport. For services to transport.
- John Neil Buxton, General Manager, Association of Community Rail Partnerships. For services to local and rural railways.
- David Alexander Canning. For services to children, young people and education.
- Zoe Elizabeth Carr, Chief Executive Officer, WISE Academies Multi Academy Trust. For services to education.
- Katharine Elizabeth Carruthers, Director, UCL Institute of Education, Confucius Institute for Schools. For services to education.
- Suranga Chandratillake FREng, General Partner, Balderton Capital. For services to engineering and technology.
- Professor Antony Chapman, lately Vice Chancellor, Cardiff Metropolitan University. For services to higher education.
- Sarah Joanne Churchman, Head of Diversity, Inclusion and Employee Wellbeing, PricewaterhouseCoopers. For services to women in business.
- Jane Clare (Margaret Jane Buddle), lately Executive Producer, English Touring Theatre. For services to drama.
- Catherine Jane Clarke, lately Headteacher, King's Oak Primary School, New Malden. For services to education.
- Kevin Leslie Clifford, lately Chief Nurse, NHS Sheffield Clinical Commissioning Group. For services to nursing.
- Lynn Codling, Executive Headteacher, Portswood Primary and St Mary's CE Primary School. For services to education.
- Joanna Clare Coleman, Director of Strategy, Energy Technologies Institute. For services to the energy sector.
- Michael Hyde Collon. For parliamentary and public service.
- Professor Sally-Ann Cooper, Professor of Learning Disabilities, University of Glasgow. For services to science and medicine.
- Stephen Melville Criddle, Principal, South Devon College, Paignton. For services to education.
- Professor Timothy John Crow, Honorary Scientific Director, Prince of Wales International Centre for SANE Research. For services to schizophrenia research and treatments.
- David Deane, Headteacher, St Thomas of Canterbury Primary School, National Leader for Education and Ofsted Inspector. For services to primary education.
- Anthony Peter Delahunty, Non-Executive Board Member, Marine Management Organisation. For services to the fishing industry.
- Ranjit Lal Dheer. For services to local government and to charity.
- Robert John (Jack) Dobson, Group Executive Director, Dunbia (NI) Ltd and Consultant, Cranswick (Ballymena) Ltd. For services to economic development in Northern Ireland.
- Caroline Docherty, Deputy Keeper of the Signet. For services to the legal profession and the Society of Writers to Her Majesty's Signet.
- Dr. David Docherty, Chief Executive, National Centre for Universities and Business. For services to higher education and business.
- Geraldine Patricia Doherty. For services to public safety and social care.
- Nicholas Byron Drinkal, Deputy Director, Border Force, Home Office. For services to border security in Calais and Dunkirk.
- Dr. Michael Anthony Patrick Durkin, lately National Director, Patient Safety, NHS England. For services to patient safety.
- Ian Trevor Edwards, Executive Vice President, Spectrum Geo. For services to the UK oil and gas exploration industry.
- Robert Thomas Edwards, Chairman, Scotframe Timber Engineering Ltd. For services to business and charity in Inverurie, Aberdeenshire.
- Oliver James Entwistle, lately Chair, Civil Service Rainbow Alliance. For services to diversity and inclusion in the civil service.
- Raymond Marvin Entwistle. For voluntary and charitable services particularly to the arts in Scotland.
- Professor Margaret Catherine Frame, Professor of Cancer Research and Science Director, Edinburgh Cancer Research Centre. For services to cancer research.
- Lynne Joanne Franks. For services to business, fashion and women's empowerment.
- Dr. Janet Frost, Chief Executive, Health Research Authority. For services health and social care research.
- Andrew John Fry, lately Chief Fire Officer and Chief Executive, Royal Berkshire Fire and Rescue Service. For services to the fire and rescue service.
- Carol Garrett, Team Leader for Ports and Borders, Trading Standards. For services to business.
- Graham Henry Tarbet Garvie, lately Convener, Scottish Borders Council. For services to local government and to the community in the Scottish Borders.
- Alan James Giles, Non-Executive Director, Competition and Markets Authority. For services to UK business and the economy.
- Dr. John Harry Godber, Writer and Director. For services to the arts.
- Jonathan Philip Pryce Goodwin, Entrepreneur and Co-founder, Lepe Partners and the Founders Forum. For services to the economy.
- Professor Ian Michael Goodyer, Professor of Child and Adolescent Psychiatry, University of Cambridge. For services to psychiatry research.
- Ellvena Graham, Chair, Northern Ireland Economic Advisory Group. For services to the economy and the advancement of women in business.
- Dr. Giles Andrew Graham, Technical Sponsor, Atomic Weapons Establishment. For services to national security and counter terrorism.
- Professor Hilary Joyce Grainger Viner, Dean, Academic Development and Quality Assurance, London College of Fashion, University of the Arts London. For services to higher education.
- David Greensmith, Justices' Clerk, HM Courts and Tribunals Service. For services to the administration of justice and to the UK Scout movement.
- Professor Christopher Ernest Maitland Griffiths, Foundation Professor of Dermatology, Faculty of Biology, Medicine and Health, University of Manchester. For services to dermatology.
- Revel Sarah Guest Albert, Chair, Hay Festival. For services to literature.
- Philip Hamilton, Chief Executive Officer and Founding Trustee, Community Academies Trust. For services to education.
- Willimina Ann Beauchamp (Annie) Hampson, Chief Planning Officer and Development Director, City of London Corporation. For services to planning in London.
- Dr. Shabana Rounak Haque, Head, Government Science and Engineering Profession Team, Government Office for Science. For services to civil service science and the engineering profession.
- Edward Mortimer Harley. For services to heritage.
- Dennis Harvey, Leader, Nuneaton and Bedworth Borough Council. For political service in Warwickshire.
- Frances Anne Hawkes, Headteacher, the Federation of St Elphege's and Regina Coeli Catholic Schools. For services to education.
- Judith Ann Hay, Assistant Director for Children and Families, North Yorkshire County Council. For services to child protection in North Yorkshire.
- Paul Leslie Hayden QFSM, chair, Anglian Eastern Regional Flood and Coastal Committee. For services to flood risk management and disaster response.
- Francesca Elizabeth Hegyi, Executive Director, Hull City of Culture 2017. For services to culture in Hull.
- Jeannine Hendrick, Governor, HM Prison Exeter and Violence Reduction Project Manager. For services to prison safety and governance.
- Robert Herman-Smith. For services to the global aerospace sector.
- Jacqueline Hewitt-Main, Chief Executive Officer, the Cascade Foundation. For services to prisoners.
- Dr. Stanley Derek Higgins, lately Chief Executive, North East Process Industry Cluster. For services to the chemical process industry.
- Dr. Graham Russell Hoare, Director of Global Product Verification, Engineering Operations, Ford Motor Company. For services to the automotive industry.
- Barbara Jane Holm, Principal, Westminster Adult Education Service and Founder, National Adult Community Learning Support and Development Network. For services to adult education.
- Eamonn Holmes. For services to broadcasting.
- Joseph Holness QPM, Lately Inspector, Kent Police. For services to policing and the National Police Memorial Day.
- Ralph Christopher Hoult. For services to the community in Ramsgate, Kent.
- Professor Margaret Ann House (Mrs. Calderback), Vice-Chancellor, Leeds Trinity University. For services to higher education.
- Nora Helen Houston, Senior Delivery Manager, HM Revenue and Customs. For services to taxpayers.
- John Hudson. For political and public service.
- Joan Ingram (Mrs. Logan), For voluntary service to healthcare, particularly Type 1 diabetes treatment.
- Rilesh Kumar Jadeja, National Access to Work Delivery Manager, Department for Work and Pensions. For services to people with disabilities.
- Poppy Jaman, Chief Executive, Mental Health First Aid England. For services to people with mental health issues.
- Clare James, Ministry of Defence. For services to defence.
- Richard James, Tailor. For services to men's fashion.
- David Johnston, Chief Executive, Social Mobility Foundation. For services to social mobility and education.
- Harry Johnston. For services to charity and the community in Manchester.
- Philip James Kevin Jones, Defence Adviser to the Ukrainian Ministry of Defence. For services to international defence relations.
- Rohinton Minoo Kalifa, Vice Chairman Worldpay. For services to financial services and technology.
- Stephanie Jane Karpetas, Founder and Director, Sustainability Connections CIC and director, Orchard Community Energy. For services to the community in East Kent.
- Martin Kelly, Head of Resources, Children and Young People's Services, North Yorkshire County Council. For services to children and young people in North Yorkshire.
- Aina Khan. For services to the protection of women and children in unregistered marriages.
- Rosamund Ann Kidman Cox, Wildlife Editor and Writer. For services to wildlife conservation through photography.
- William Stanyer Kilby, Deputy Head, Afghanistan, Department for International Development. For services to International Development.
- Heather Clare Knight, Captain, England Women's Cricket Team. For services to cricket.
- Emma Shevvan Knights, Chief Executive, National Governance Association. For services to education.
- Paromita Konar-Thakkar, Deputy Director, Energy Economics and Analysis, Department for Business, Energy and Industrial Strategy. For services to energy analysis.
- Professor Elizabeth Alice Kuipers, Professor of Clinical Psychology, King's College, London. For services to clinical research, treatment and support for people with psychosis.
- Deborah Lamb, Deputy Chief Executive, Historic England. For services to heritage.
- Stephen Alan Lamb, lately Director, Returns Preparation, Immigration Enforcement, Home Office. For services to improving immigration systems.
- Susan Lancioni, Customer Insight and Analysis Lead, HM Revenue and Customs. For services to UK and global nuclear security.
- Bernard Derek Lane, Grade 6, Tackling Crime Unit, Crime Policing and Fire Group, Home Office. For services to community safety and reducing crime.
- Professor Hilary Margaret Lappin-Scott. For services to microbiology and the advancement of women in science and engineering.
- Donna Leong, Deputy Director, Consumer and Competition Policy, Department for Business, Energy and Industrial Strategy. For services to business.
- Sarah Lewis, Secretary General, International Ski Federation. For services to sport.
- Professor Christopher Swee Chau Liu, Consultant Ophthalmic Surgeon, Sussex Eye Hospital. For services to ophthalmology.
- Alwen Lyons, lately Company Secretary, Post Office Ltd. For services to the post office and to equality and diversity.
- Dr. Rajan Madhok, Trustee, Darlinda's Charity for Renal Research. For services to renal research and tackling health inequalities in Scotland.
- Dr. Clifford John Mann, President, Royal College of Emergency Medicine. For services to emergency medicine.
- Naomi Marek, Chief Executive, Sky Badger. For services to special educational needs.
- Jane Marjorie Marriott, Cabinet Office. For services to public administration and finance.
- Wendy Matthews, Director of Midwifery and Deputy Chief Nurse, Barking, Havering, and Redbridge University Hospitals NHS Trust. For services to midwifery.
- Olive Mary Maybin, lately Strategic Policy Adviser to Head of the Northern Ireland Civil Service. For public service.
- Geraldine McAndrew, Chief Executive, Buttle UK and chair, Grant Management Panel, Consortium of Voluntary Adoption Agencies. For services to the voluntary sector.
- Bernice Alda McCabe, Headmistress, North London Collegiate School. For services to education.
- Dr. Elizabeth Angela McDonnell, lately Head, Biomass Electricity Policy, Department for Business, Energy and Industrial Strategy. For services to bioenergy policy.
- John McGregor, Founder, Contamac. For services to international trade and innovation in polymer technology.
- John Ian McLauchlan. For services to rugby and charity.
- Dr. Clive Julian Meux, Consultant Forensic Psychiatrist, Oxford Health NHS Foundation Trust. For services to people with mental ill health.
- Rosemary Harriet Millard, Chair, Hull City of Culture 2017. For services to culture in Hull.
- Richard Mintz. For services to philanthropy.
- Victoria Marion Miro, Gallery Owner. For services to art.
- Deborah Moggach. For services to literature and drama.
- Dr. Patricia Anne Moore, Regional Chairman, South West of England, Conservative Party. For voluntary political service.
- Jonathan Howell Morgan. For services to disability sport in Wales.
- Colin Morrison. For charitable services to vulnerable young people.
- Edward Francis Morrison. For services to rugby union.
- Elma Murray, Chief Executive, North Ayrshire Council. For services to local government, education and the economy.
- Vinodka (Vin) Murria. For services to the UK digital economy and advancing women in the software sector.
- Robert Anthony Neil, Head, Project Race, Ministry of Justice. For services to race equality in the workplace and the community.
- Grace Foster Nesbitt, Head, Pensions Division, Department of Finance, Northern Ireland Executive. For services to government in Northern Ireland and for voluntary and charitable services.
- Dr. Trevor Leo Ogden. For services to occupational hygiene and workplace air quality.
- Anthony O'Hear, Professor of Philosophy and lately Head, Department of Education, University of Buckingham. For services to education.
- Gavin David Redvers Oldham. For services to children and young people through the share foundation.
- Sarah Louise Parkinson (Lou Cordwell), Chief Executive Officer, Magnetic North. For services to the creative and digital economy.
- Kevin Allen Huw Parry, Chairman, Royal National Children's Springboard Foundation. For services to vulnerable children.
- Norman Nathaniel Pascal, lately Chief Inspector Operations, Avon and Somerset Constabulary. For services to diversity in the community in Avon and Somerset.
- John Cook Pattullo, lately Chair, NHS Blood and Transplant. For services to healthcare.
- Graham Richard Pellew, lately Deputy Chief Executive Officer, Families for Children Adoption Agency. For services to children.
- Dr. Lynsey Pinfield, Grade 6, British Defence Staff Washington. For services to international defence relations.
- Nicholas Powell, lately Director, National Film and Television School. For services to the music, film and television industries.
- William John Priestley. For services to criminal justice.
- Antony Alan Pritchard, Deputy Command Secretary, Navy Command, Ministry of Defence. For services to the Royal Navy.
- Jonathan Peter Pywell, City Culture and Place Manager, Hull City Council. For services to culture.
- Rhona Mary Quinn. For services to the construction industry and the community in Northern Ireland.
- Jaswant Ramewal, Ministry of Defence. For services to defence.
- Barbara Kathleen Rayment, Director, Youth Access. For services to children and young people.
- Dr. Dorothy Glenda Cerys Rees, Fellow, Chemical and Biological Analysis, Defence Science and Technology Laboratory. For services to defence.
- Richard Rhodes, District Manager, Essex, Work Services Directorate, Department for Work and Pensions. For services to disadvantaged people in Essex.
- Gary Ridley, Assistant Chief Officer, Durham Constabulary. For services to policing.
- Mark Robinson, Head Coach, England Women's Cricket Team. For services to cricket.
- Dr. Marian Brooke Rogers, Reader in Risk and Terror, King's College London. For services to academia and government.
- Christian Rucker MBE, Founder, the White Company. For services to retail.
- Dr. Lesley Sawers, Equality and Human Rights Commissioner for Scotland. For services to business and equality.
- Teresa Patricia Scott, Founder and Chief Executive Officer, Kennedy Scott. For services to entrepreneurship and employability.
- Professor Judith Carmel Sebba. For services to higher education and to disadvantaged young people.
- Alison Norma Sellar, Chief Executive, Activpayroll. For services to business in Scotland and abroad.
- Professor Richard Sennett, Chair, LSE Cities Programme. For services to design.
- Samenua Sesher, Coach and Culture Management Consultant. For services to art.
- Naymitkumar Shah, Manager, International Liaison Officer, National Crime Agency. For services to law enforcement and diversity.
- John Strother Shallcross. For voluntary services to young people and youth clubs in the North East.
- Pauline Shaw, Director of Care and Service Development, the Royal Star and Garter Homes. For services to veterans.
- Professor Andrew Hoseason Shennan, Consultant Obstetrician, St Thomas' Hospital London. For services to maternity care.
- Acting Detective Inspector David John Simm, Metropolitan Police Service. For services to national security and counter terrorism.
- Professor John Anthony Sloboda FBA, Research Professor, Guildhall School of Music and Drama. For services to psychology and music.
- Annika Elisabeth Small, Social Entrepreneur and co-founder, Centre for Acceleration of Social Technology. For services to social innovation and digital technology.
- Bartholomew Evan Eric Smith, Founder, Amber Foundation. For services to young people.
- Colin Stuart Squire. For services to the horticultural industry and to charity.
- Emeritus Professor Nicholas David Stafford, Professor of Otolaryngology, Head and Neck Surgery, University of Hull. For services to medical research and healthcare.
- Peter Graham Stebbings, lately Regional Chairman, East of England, Conservative Party. For voluntary political service in the East of England.
- Professor Mary (Maria) Josephine Stokes, Professor of Musculoskeletal Rehabilitation, University of Southampton. For services to physiotherapy research.
- Lynne Marie Swift, Director of People and Organisational Development, Buckinghamshire Fire and Rescue Service. For services to the fire and rescue service.
- Paul Taiano, Chair of Governors, Central School of Speech and Drama. For services to drama training and horse racing welfare.
- Timothy William Trelawny Tatton-Brown. For services to heritage.
- Kim Bernadette Taylor, Headteacher, Spring Common Academy. For services to education.
- Julia Templeman, Chief Executive Officer, Northampton Primary Academy Trust Partnership. For services to education.
- Teresa Tennant, Co-founder Jupiter Ecology Fund. For services to sustainable investment.
- Professor Angela Eleine Thomas (Mrs. Brown), Consultant Paediatric Haematologist, Royal Hospital for Sick Children, Edinburgh. For services to the regulation of public health.
- David Barrie Thompson, Head, First World War and Ceremonials Team, Department for Digital, Culture, Media and Sport. For services to the First World War centenary commemorations.
- Professor Richard Charles Thompson, Professor of Marine Biology, University of Plymouth. For services to marine science.
- John Richard Tiffany, Director. For services to drama.
- Dr. Sally Clare Uren, Chief Executive, Forum for the Future. For services to sustainability practice in business.
- Dr. James Patrick Vestey, lately Consultant Dermatologist and Head of Service, NHS Highland. For services to dermatology.
- Marc Ferdinand Vlessing, Chief Executive Officer, Pocket Living. For services to housing delivery.
- Dr. Joanne Wade, Chief Executive, Association for the Conservation of Energy. For services to energy efficiency.
- Paul Walker, Grade 6, Department for Environment, Food and Rural Affairs. For services to engineering, bio-containment and UK animal, plant and food science.
- Sam Kennedy-Warburton. For services to rugby union.
- William Ward, Chief Cxecutive Officer and Co-founder, Clipper Round the World Yacht Race. For services to the economy and the GREAT Campaign.
- David Arwyn Watkins, Managing Director, Cambrian Training Company. For services to education and training in Wales.
- Professor Kathryn Anne Whaler, Chair of Geophysics, University of Edinburgh. For services to geophysics.
- Nicholas Charles Tyrwhitt Wheeler, Founder and managing director, Charles Tyrwhitt Shirts. For services to retail.
- Joyce Helen White, Chief Executive, West Dunbartonshire Council. For services to local government, further education and Girlguiding.
- Linda Teresa Willson, lately Head, Maritime Commerce and Infrastructure, Department for Transport. For services to transport.
- Richard Wilson, Head, Office of the chairman and Chief Executive, Maritime and Coastguard Agency. For services to transport.
- Dr. Richard Christopher Wilson, Chief Executive Officer, Independent Game Developers Association. For services to the video game industry.
- Diane Winder, Neighbourhood Watch Coordinator, West Yorkshire Police. For services to community safety.
- Elizabeth Wolverson, Chief Executive, London Diocesan Board For Schools Academies Trust. For services to education.
- John Nicholas Woolf, co-founder, Charities Leadership Programme. For services to the charitable sector in the UK and abroad.
- Marion Wynn. For services to Girlguiding in the UK and abroad.

Diplomatic Service and Overseas List

- Margaret Therese Al-Sayer, Founding Director, Kuwait Association for the Care of Children in Hospital and the Bayt Abdullah Children's Hospice, Kuwait. For services to child health and hospice provision in Kuwait.
- Susanna Gisela Berry, deputy director, Foreign and Commonwealth Office. For services to national security.
- Simon Chapman, First Secretary, Foreign and Commonwealth Office. For services to British foreign policy.
- Angus John Clarkson, lately Head, Syria Office, Amman, Foreign and Commonwealth Office. For services to furthering UK interests in Jordan and Dyria.
- Hannah Kathryn Cockburn-Logie MVO Head, political and bilateral affairs, British high commission, new delhi. For services to UK/India relations.
- Colin Wynn Crorkin MBE Lately HM Ambassador, banjul, Gambia. For services to British interests in the Gambia.
- Karen Danesi, First Secretary, Foreign and Commonwealth Office. For services to British foreign policy.
- Matthew Kingswood, First Secretary, Foreign and Commonwealth Office. For services to British foreign policy.
- Robert James Lygoe, First Secretary, Foreign and Commonwealth Office. For services to British foreign policy.
- Olive Hilda Miller, Community volunteer. For services to the community in the Cayman Islands.
- Dr. Paul Willion Munro Faure, former deputy director, Climate Energy and Tenure Division, United Nations Food and Agriculture Organisation, Rome. For services to the development of international land policy.
- Stephen Christopher Phillips, Chief Executive, China/Britain Business Council, China. For services to promoting trade and investment in support of UK/China relations.
- Hugh Stanley Philpott, HM Ambassador, Dushanbe, Tajikistan. For services to British foreign policy.
- Consulota Carmen Price, British Council Country Director, Nigeria. For services to UK/Nigeria cultural relations.
- Professor Christopher Douglas Rudd, Provost and chief executive officer, University of Nottingham, Ningbo, China. For services to higher education and UK/China co-operation.
- Professor Patrick Salmon, Chief Historian, Foreign and Commonwealth Office. For services to British foreign policy.
- Nichola Jane Samuel, First Secretary, Foreign and Commonwealth Office. For services to the British government's legal service.
- Susan Barbara Speller, lately Consul General, Düsseldorf. For services to UK/German relations.
- Dr. Philip Neil Trathan, Head, Conservation Biology, British Antarctic Survey and Scientific Adviser to the Commission for the Conservation of Antarctic Marine Living Resources. For services to southern ocean science and conservation.
- Barbara Wickham, British Council Country Director, Bangladesh. For services to UK/Bangladesh and UK/Pakistan cultural relations.

==== Member of the Order of the British Empire (MBE) ====
Military Division

Royal Navy

- Warrant Officer 1 (Communications Technician) David John Bagnall
- Major Kevin Charles Carter GM Royal Marines
- Colour Sergeant Daniel Gad Curtis, Royal Marines
- Major Edward Charles Malet Hall, Royal Marines
- Lieutenant Commander (now Commander) Richard Paul Hewitt
- Commander John Lea
- Lieutenant Commander David Francis McInerney
- Warrant Officer 1 (Seaman) Robert Ratcliffe
- Lieutenant Commander (Acting Commander) Stephen Eric Saywell-Hall
- Surgeon Lieutenant Commander Manish Tayal
- Lieutenant Commander David Nicholas Wilcocks

Army

- Acting Lieutenant Colonel James Bain, Combined Cadet Force
- Major David Andrew Barringer, Corps of Army Music
- Major Adam Christopher Birley, Corps of Royal Engineers
- Acting Corporal Thomas Oliver Briggs, Royal Corps of Signals
- Captain Glen Paul Bullivant, Royal Army Medical Corps
- Corporal Craig Cardy, Corps of Royal Engineers
- Major Andrew John Carter, Royal Regiment of Artillery
- Major John Robert Chetty, the Parachute Regiment
- Staff Sergeant Louis John Cleary, Royal Corps of Signals
- Major Barry James Cooke, Adjutant General's Corps (Staff and Personnel Support Branch)
- Major Oliver Philip Butler Dobson, the Royal Regiment of Scotland
- Captain Martin Geoffrey Doherty, Royal Regiment of Artillery
- Warrant Officer Class 1 George Richard Douglas, the Royal Irish Regiment, Army Reserve
- Warrant Officer Class 1 Roy Paul Duffin, Corps of Royal Electrical and Mechanical Engineers, Army Reserve
- Major Damian John Flanagan, the Rifles
- Lieutenant Colonel Richard Michael Garbutt, Corps of Royal Electrical and Mechanical Engineers
- Lieutenant Colonel Timothy John Gillies, Corps of Royal Electrical and Mechanical Engineers
- Major Paul Dennis Headington, the Parachute Regiment
- Captain Timothy Shanti Holmes-Mitra, Royal Canadian Corps of Signals
- Staff Sergeant David Mark Jones, Intelligence Corps
- Sergeant Christopher Robert Jordan, the Parachute Regiment
- Captain Kevin Kirkham-Brown, Royal Corps of Signals, Army Reserve
- Major Edwyn Nicholas Launders, Welsh Guards
- Staff Sergeant Adrienne Richelle Lavery, Adjutant General's Corps (Staff and Personnel Support Branch)
- Major James Douglas Louther Leask, Scots Guards
- Warrant Officer Class 1 John Richard Lewis, Corps of Royal Electrical and Mechanical Engineers
- Lieutenant Colonel Lorraine Elizabeth Markham, Intelligence Corps
- Warrant Officer Class 2 Neil McRae Martin, the Royal Logistic Corps, Army Reserve
- Warrant Officer Class 2 Todd William McCartney, Intelligence Corps
- Sergeant Matthew Robert McGlown, Royal Corps of Signals
- Major Andrew Thomas George McLannahan, the Princess of Wales's Royal Regiment
- Lieutenant Colonel Paula Janet Nicholas, Adjutant General's Corps (Staff and Personnel Support Branch)
- Major Thomas Michael Parsons, Scots Guards
- Captain Simon Colin Paterson, Intelligence Corps
- Major Richard William Roberts, Corps of Royal Engineers
- Major Bijayant Sherchan, the Royal Gurkha Rifles
- Major John Patrick Tymon, Army Air Corps
- Captain Grant Wallace, Royal Corps of Signals
- Major Aaron John West, the Rifles

Royal Air Force

- Wing Commander Edward Challoner, Royal Air Force Volunteer Reserve (Training)
- Wing Commander John Howard Davies
- Flight Sergeant Alison Frances Fisher
- Squadron Leader Martin Geraghty
- Corporal Liam Paul Grime
- Warrant Officer Alan Stuart Hart
- Squadron Leader Scott Smith MacColl
- Squadron Leader Thomas Martin McMorrow, Royal Air Force Volunteer Reserve (Training)
- Sergeant Louise Mary Mullen
- Corporal Anthony Grant Muller
- Squadron Leader James Andrew Schofield
- Warrant Officer Robert Ernest Weaving

Civil Division

- Charmian Jacqueline (Jackie) Adams-Bonitto, Head of Training Assurance, London Fire Brigade. For services to the fire and rescue service and to equality and diversity.
- Joyce Adeluwoye-Adams, lately Head of Diversity, PACT. For services to diversity in the media.
- Philipa Ann Ailion, Casting Director. For services to theatre and diversity in the arts.
- Adetunji Adeboyejo Akintokun, Director of CISCO Systems and co-director, Your Future, Your Ambition. For services to young people from minority ethnic backgrounds in science and technology.
- Dr. Anwara Ali, General Practitioner, the Spitalfields Practice, East London. For services to community healthcare.
- Daphne Claire Amlôt. For voluntary service to the community in Wirral, Merseyside.
- Peter Robert Andrew, deputy chairman, House Builders Federation. For services to the construction industry.
- Maria Angel. For services to the community in Normandy, Surrey.
- Susan Jane Anstiss. For services to grassroots and women's sport.
- Afrasiab Anwar. For services to community cohesion in Burnley.
- Ethel Armstrong, chair, NHS Retirement Fellowship. For services to the NHS workforce and retired people.
- Janet Mary Armstrong. For services to the community in Oakworth, West Yorkshire.
- Sally Arnison, Pharmacist and director, Barnton Pharmacy and Travel Clinic. For services to healthcare and the community in Edinburgh.
- Dr. Elaine Louise Atkins, Programme Leader, Society of Musculoskeletal Medicine. For services to physiotherapy.
- Elizabeth Rachel Atkinson, Cancer Specialist Nurse, Cancer Focus Northern Ireland. For services to cancer patients and their families.
- Robert Henry Bagley. For services to disadvantaged children and the community in Canterbury, Kent.
- Lisa Anne Baldock, Administrative Officer, Human Resources, Department for Work and Pensions. For services to people with disabilities in public service.
- Iain Godfrey Ball. For services to cathedral choral music and to young people.
- Joan Bamber, Governor, Dame Evelyn Fox and Newfield Schools. For services to education.
- Comfort Louise Anna Banahene, Head of Educational Engagement, University of Leeds. For services to higher education.
- Isabella Bell Banks, Secretary, Lightburn Elderly Association Project. For services to older people in South Lanarkshire.
- Norman Leslie Banner. For public and charitable services.
- Anne Ellen (Annie) Barr, Founder, Annie Barr Associates. For services to exports in healthcare.
- Michael John Barratt, Director of Road Space Management, Surface Transport. For services to transport.
- Claire Elizabeth Batt, Welfare Officer, Defence Police Federation. For services to the Ministry of Defence police.
- Philip Andrew Batt. For services to community safety in Northern Ireland.
- Jean Barbara Beauchamp. For services to young people in Lockerley, Hampshire.
- Tamsin Tilley Beaumont. For services to cricket.
- Sara Catherine Beauregard, co-founder, Youth Vision. For services to special needs education in Edinburgh.
- William Alexander Beckett. For services to the voluntary sector and to sport.
- Cindy Bonita Beckford, Principal Programme Controls Manager, Network Rail, Network Operations, High Speed Rail Phase One Team. For services to the railway industry.
- Michael Bell. For services to the Cardiff Philharmonic Orchestra.
- Paul Nicholas Berman, Chair of Trustees, Wargrave House School. For services to children with special educational needs and disabilities.
- Onkardeep Singh Bhatia. For services to the community particularly young people.
- Detective Constable Timothy John Bird, North Wales Police. For services to policing and the community in North Wales.
- Robert George Black, Northern Ireland District Chairman, Royal British Legion. For services to ex-service personnel and their families.
- Rosamund Anne Blair, County Vice-president, Girlguiding Dunbartonshire and Instructor, Riding for the Disabled. For services to children and people with disabilities.
- Lorraine Bliss. For services to disadvantaged young people in Norfolk and Suffolk.
- Neil David Bohanna, Head of Operations, Royal Northern College of Music. For services to higher education.
- Donovan Bolessa, Head of International Visits, Department for International Trade. For services to international trade.
- Leanne Jayne Bonner-Cooke, managing director, Evolve-IT Consulting Ltd. For services to women in business.
- Barbara Bower, Foster Carer, West Sussex County Council. For services to children and families.
- Christine Ann Bower, Athletes' Services Coordinator, British Olympic Association. For services to British Olympic sport.
- John Edwards Bowers, Chair of Governors, Dixons Kings Academy. For services to education.
- Patricia Edith Boyd. For services to religious and moral education in Scotland.
- Douglas Bradbury, Master Farrier and Fellow, Worshipful Company of Farriers. For services to the farrier profession and the community in the East Midlands.
- Jayne Brady. For services to economic development in Northern Ireland.
- Ian James Brailey JP. For services to the magistracy and the community in Bristol.
- Lucille De Zalduondo Briance, Founder, London Children's Ballet. For services to dance.
- Morris Bright, Leader, Hertsmere Borough Council. For services to local government.
- John Ross Brodie, Chief Executive, Scottish Midland Co-operative Society. For services to business and the voluntary sector in Scotland.
- Joanna Caroline Jane Brotherstone, Governor, Greenmead School, Wandsworth, London and co-founder, Small Steps Charity. For services to children with special educational needs and disabilities.
- Christopher Malcolm Brown, Governor, Sir Tom Finney Community High School, Preston. For services to children with special educational needs and disabilities.
- James (Jim) Brown, Policy Officer, Secure Children's Homes, Department for Education. For services to education.
- Carol Leslie Browne, Coordinator, 16 Air Assault Brigade, Ministry of Defence. For services to army personnel.
- Deborah Louise Brownson. For services to autism awareness.
- Dr. Jane Bruce, lately Clinical Director, Out of Hours Service, NHS Tayside. For services to general practice and primary care services in Tayside.
- Colin George Bryant. For services to young people.
- Adrian James Bull, Director of External Relations, National Nuclear Laboratory. For services to the development of public understanding in nuclear research.
- Michael Burgess. For services to disadvantaged young people in North Tyneside.
- David Richard Beveridge Burn. For services to the magistracy and the community in Hexham, Northumberland.
- Margaret Rose Burn. For services to the salvation army and vulnerable people.
- Kathleen Nancy Burns. For services to post 16 education and skills in Wales.
- Jessica Rose Butcher Simpson, co-founder and director, Blippar. For services to digital technology and entrepreneurship.
- Sarah Butcher, Director of Care, Priors Court School, Berkshire. For services to children with special educational needs and disabilities.
- Charles Richard Butler, Assistant Headteacher (Community) and Head of Performing Arts, Ulverston Victoria High School, Cumbria. For services to music education.
- Darrell George Buttery. For services to heritage in York.
- Philip Peter Buxton. For services to mountain rescue and the community in Cumbria.
- Rosemary Jayne Cadbury. For services to philanthropy and the community in Bournville, West Midlands.
- Donald Delachevois Campbell, lately chairman, East Devon Area of Outstanding Natural Beauty. For services to nature conservation.
- Hilary Cantle. For services to the older people and to charity in Bedfordshire and Hertfordshire.
- Ian David Carnell. For services to young people in Solihull.
- Monica Catherine Carroll. For services to the community in South Yorkshire.
- Craig Carscadden. For services to athletes with disabilities and to the Paralympics.
- David Carter. For services to the community in Teesside.
- Richard Alan Carter, Governor, West Suffolk College. For services to education.
- John Millar Caskie. For services to the community in Dumfries.
- Balwant Singh Chadha, lately Councillor, North Lanarkshire Council. For services to local government and community cohesion in the West of Scotland.
- Professor David Hugh Gray Cheape. For services to Scottish cultural education and traditional music.
- Cynthia Louise Hart Cherry JP. For services to the community and charitable fundraising in Northern Ireland.
- Claire Marie Chippington, deputy director, Border Force, Home Office. For services to border security.
- Elinor Chohan, chair, North West Regional Board, Remembering Srebrenica. For services to interfaith and community cohesion.
- Nicola Clark, Tax Professional Manager, HM Revenue and Customs. For services to business and the community in the North East.
- Derek Kenneth Clarke, Duke of Edinburgh's Award Coordinator, Broxbourne and Richard Hale Schools. For services to young people in Hertfordshire.
- Jane Helen Clarke, lately Chief Executive, Churches Housing Association, Dudley and District. For services to vulnerable women and children.
- Catherine Vivian Lindsay Clay. For political and public service.
- Jeffrey Alan Coates, Social Worker and Member, Adoption Support Expert Advisory Group. For services to children.
- Susan Mary Coates. For services to Girlguiding.
- Paul Anthony Cobbing, chief executive officer, National Flood Forum. For services to flood management risk.
- Lieutenant Colonel Mordaunt Cohen TD DL. For services to Second World War education.
- Michael Francis Coker. For services to the community in Warwickshire.
- Linda Colclough. For services to victims of sexual abuse in West Yorkshire.
- Mary Barbara Collen, Volunteer, Young Witness Service, NSPCC. For services to children and young people in Northern Ireland.
- George Edward Colligan. For services to the museums sector.
- Christine Rosemary Collins, Member, Northern Ireland Rare Disease Partnership. For services to people with rare diseases.
- Alec George Collyer, chairman, Dartmoor Search and Rescue Group. For services to search and rescue in Dartmoor.
- Christopher Constantine, Ministry of Defence. For services to defence.
- Martin James Paul Cooke. For services to the arts and the community in Chester, Tattenhall and North Cornwall.
- Wendy Coombey, Community Partnership and Funding Officer, Hereford Diocese. For services to churches in Herefordshire.
- Dr. Tracey Cooper, Head of midwifery, Warrington and Halton Hospitals NHS Foundation Trust. For services to midwifery.
- James Cosmo Copeland, actor. For services to drama.
- Royston Vincent Court. For services to inclusive judo.
- Richard Cowie, Musician. For services to music.
- Gail Crouchman, Senior Officer, Border Force, Home Office. For services to border security and prevention of modern slavery.
- Brian Albert Leopold Davies, Senior Executive officer, Engineering Authority, Ministry of Defence. For services to military aviation.
- Dr. Ian Morris Davies, Programme Manager, Renewables and Energy, Marine Scotland Science. For services to marine science and voluntary service in the UK and abroad.
- Alan Davis, Coach, Maindy Flyers, Cardiff and Newport. For services to youth cycling and diversity inclusion in South Wales.
- Bobby Gurbhej Singh Dev. For services to young people in Sheffield, South Yorkshire.
- Albert George Dicken. For charitable services.
- Gillian Dillon, Senior Executive officer, District Employer and Partnership Manager, Department for Work and Pensions. For services to employment and skills in the Humber.
- Nora Dillon. For services to affordable housing, credit management and the community in Rutherglen and Cambuslang, South Lanarkshire.
- Julie Dixon. For services to the community in Northumberland.
- Nicholas Dobrik, Volunteer, the Thalidomide Trust. For services to people affected by thalidomide.
- Michael John Doherty. For services to community cohesion in Northern Ireland.
- Grant Jonathan Douglas, Founder and chief executive officer, S'up Products Limited. For services to people with disabilities.
- Mary Louise Drinkwater. For services to the community in Worcester.
- Jill Dudley-Toole, chair, Frank Dudley Ltd. For services to business and the community in Birmingham.
- David Duke, Founder and Chief Executive, Street Soccer Scotland. For services to football and socially disadvantaged people.
- Alexander Duncan, Regional Commissioner, East Region, Scout Association. For services to the scouting movement and the Vine Trust.
- Dr. William Jake Dunning, Deputy Programme Director for High Consequence Infectious Disease, NHS England. For services to clinical research.
- Karyn Dunning, Head of Detained Casework, Immigration Enforcement, Home Office. For services to asylum and humanitarian operations.
- Richard Anthony Edwards. For services to the community in Hastings.
- Derek Ernest Elton. For services to scouting and the community in Stourbridge, West Midlands.
- John Alfred Eltringham, Chairman of Trustees, South Shields Sea Cadets. For voluntary service to young people.
- Dr. Alistair Mark Emslie-Smith, General Practitioner, Arthurstone Medical Centre, Dundee. For services to healthcare, particularly diabetes treatment in Scotland.
- Dr. David Martyn Evans, lately General Practitioner, Budleigh Salterton Health Centre. For services to the community in Budleigh Salterton, Devon.
- Geoffrey Frank Evans. For services to local government and the community in Falmouth.
- Maria Eves, Chair of Governors, Broughton Hall Catholic High School and Vice Chair, St Teresa of Lisieux Catholic Primary School. For services to education.
- Brian Timothy Exell, President, Seashell Trust and Chair of Governors, Ysgol y Deri, Penarth. For services to special needs education in Wales and England.
- Julia Emma Farman, Head, European Intake Unit, UK Visas and Immigration, Home Office. For public service.
- Neelam Farzana, co-founder and managing director, the Listening Service. For services to mental health in the community.
- Susan Mary Fazackerley. For services to the community in Lytham St. Annes, Lancashire.
- James William Ferguson. For services to mental health awareness in Devon.
- Paul Hugh Paterson Ferguson. For services to carving, gilding and conservation.
- Shimon Fhima, Programme Director, HM Revenue and Customs. For services to taxpayers.
- Norman Finlay. For services to UK shipbuilding.
- Michael William Finney, Director of Advice, Admissions and Marketing, South Cheshire College. For services to education.
- Louise Fitzroy-Stone, executive director of Sport, Guildford High School. For services to education.
- Sara Lee Fitzsimmons, Executive Charity Director, SiMBA. For services to bereaved families.
- William David Fleetwood. For services to the community in the North East of England.
- Charlie Fogarty. For services to young people in Solihull, West Midlands.
- Lawrence Forshaw, Life President, Governing Body, Alder Grange School, Rossendale, Lancashire. For services to education.
- Rebecca Jane Foster, Course Leader for Physical Education and Senior Lecturer in Adapted Physical Education, University of Worcester. For services to inclusive sport and young people.
- Dr. Rosemary Fox, National Director for Screening Programmes, Public Health Wales. For services to healthcare in Wales.
- Arthur Frost, Foster Carer, East Cheshire Council. For services to children and families.
- Dorothy Ann Frost, Foster Carer, East Cheshire Council. For services to children and families.
- Patricia Veronica Fuller. For services to the community in Norwich.
- Dr. Nicholas Pearson Gair. For services to ex-service personnel and young people in London.
- Sergeant Scott John Gallagher, North Wales Police. For services to policing and the National Police Air Service.
- Constable James David Gallienne, Devon and Cornwall Police. For services to policing and search and rescue.
- Angela Gannon, Training Standards Verifier, London and South Region, St John Ambulance. For voluntary service to first aid.
- Deborah Sylvia Gardiner, chief executive officer, Qube Learning. For services to apprenticeships and charity.
- Donovan John Gardner. For services to the community in Cornwall.
- Edward Gatenby, Head of Residence and Services, HM Prison Durham. For services to HM prison service.
- Beverly Gayle, Higher Executive officer, Department for Work and Pensions. For services to unemployed people.
- Jacqueline Alexandra Gerrard, chair of the corporation, Stode's College, Egham. For services to education.
- Margaret Emily Gianotti, Executive officer, Work Service Directorate, Department for Work and Pensions. For services to employment in South London.
- Dr. Ben Michael Goldacre, Senior Clinical Research Fellow, Centre For Evidence-Based Medicine, University of Oxford. For services to evidence in policy.
- Antony Goodman, chief executive officer, Yumsh Snacks Ltd. For services to international trade and UK exports.
- Tobiasz Gorniak. For services to young people in Plymouth.
- Craig Andrew Graham, chairman, the Spartans Community Football Academy. For services to football and the community in Edinburgh.
- Michael William Graham, lately Constable, Police Service of Northern Ireland. For services to policing and the community in Northern Ireland.
- Ruth Graham. For services to disabled and bereaved children in Northern Ireland.
- Evelyn Joan Grieve, Speaker, Children's Hospice Association Scotland. For voluntary service in Perthshire.
- Malcolm Grindrod. For services to mountain rescue in Cumbria.
- Anita Rosina Grodkiewicz, Manager, the Rosmini Centre. For services to the community in Wisbech, Cambridgeshire.
- Howard Groves, Member, Senior Mathematical Challenge Problems Group and Member, UK Mathematics Trust Challenges Sub Trust. For services to education.
- Catherine Diane Gullen. For services to children.
- Rosemary Hadfield, Member, the Clement Danes Trust Board and Associate Governor, Westfield Academy, Hertfordshire. For services to education.
- Susan Morgan Hallam, managing director, Hallam Internet Limited. For services to entrepreneurship and innovation.
- Sacha Ian Harber-Kelly, Case Controller, Serious Fraud Office. For services to investigating and prosecution of fraud, bribery and corruption.
- David Lawrence Harcourt. For services to the community in Stourbridge, West Midlands.
- Jill Hardy. For voluntary service to the arts in Dumfries and Galloway.
- Jane Harley, Team Leader, Teacher Strategy and Practice Unit, Department for Education. For services to education and to the community in Sheffield.
- Florence Harper. For services to cardiology in County Tyrone.
- Ian David Harrabin. For services to heritage and regeneration in Coventry.
- Ian Michael Harris, Chief Executive, Wine and Spirit Education Trust. For services to the wine and spirit industry.
- Ian Richard Harris, Honorary Trustee, Citizens' Advice Bureau. For services to the Citizens' Advice Bureau in Newcastle upon Tyne.
- Eric George Harrison, lately Youth Team Coach, Manchester United Football Club. For services to football.
- Professor Matthew Harrison, Trustee, STEMNET. For services to engineering and education.
- Margaret Ann Harvey, Vice Chair, Camden Association of Foster Carers. For services to children.
- Deborah Maria Heald, managing director, Heald Ltd. For services to exports and promotion of STEM careers for women.
- Peter John Heald, Director, Lunds of Otley. For services to business and the community in West Yorkshire.
- Roderick John Heather. For services to flood risk management.
- Christopher Charles Hebden, chair, Southend MENCAP. For services to people with disabilities in Essex.
- Dr. Jonathan Heggarty, Director of Curriculum, Belfast Metropolitan College. For services to further education in Northern Ireland.
- Margaret Dorothy Heller. For services to the magistracy and to vulnerable families in the community in Southampton.
- Jennifer Henderson. For parliamentary and voluntary service.
- Anne Hendy, Teacher, Hitchin Girls' School. For services to education.
- Inez May Henriques. For services to the West Midlands Caribbean Parents and Friends Association.
- Matt Henry, Actor and singer. For services to musical theatre.
- Maureen Constance Hercules, Founder and Headteacher, Dallington School, London. For services to education.
- Hedley George Heron. For services to charity and the community in Northumberland.
- Kenneth Malcolm Hewitt. For services to cross community relations in Londonderry.
- Beverley Elizabeth Hickey, Administrative Officer. For services to defence.
- Patricia Hiley. For services to adoption.
- Rachael Maria Hill Thomas, National Flood and Coastal Risk Manager, Environment Agency. For services to flood risk management and flood recovery.
- Michele Hodgson, lately chair, County Durham and Darlington Fire and Rescue Authority. For services to fire and rescue.
- Margaret Helen (Maggie) Hollingsworth, lately Trustee, Inspiration Trust. For services to education.
- Susan Yvonne Hollister, Headteacher, Cefn Hengoed Community School, Swansea. For services to education in Swansea.
- Carol Holt, Flood Incident Manager, Environment Agency. For services to flood risk management and the environment.
- Colin Roy Hopkins, School Governor and Chair of Trustees, Church of England Central Education Trust. For services to education.
- William Thomas Hopkins. For services to the community, particularly children and maritime safety, in South Wales.
- Pearline Evadney Howard, Foster Carer, Wandsworth Borough Council. For services to children and families.
- Christopher Paul Hudson, Founder and Owner, Chimo Sheffield (Manufacturing) Limited. For services to exports and investment in Sheffield.
- Alan Thomas Hughes, Area Convener, Glasgow Children's Panel. For services to the children's hearings system in Scotland.
- Glenys Irene Hughes. For services to music in Orkney and charity in Malawi.
- John Martin Hughes, managing director, Ryobi Aluminium Castings (UK). For services to economic development in Northern Ireland.
- Christopher Robin Hyson. For services to the magistracy and the community in Hampshire.
- Anthony Impey, Founder and chief executive officer, Optimity. For services to apprenticeships, small businesses and broadband connectivity.
- Lindsey Ann Isaacs, lately Head of Prevention, Dorset Fire and Rescue Service. For services to fire prevention and community safety in Dorsetshire.
- Adrian Antony Jackson, artistic director and chief executive officer, Cardboard Citizens. For services to the arts.
- Dr. Sarah Caroline Jarvis, General Practitioner, Shepherd's Bush, London. For services to general practice and public understanding of health.
- Mark Richard Jefferson, lately Higher Officer, National Deep Rummage Team Immingham, Border Force North Region, Home Office. For public service.
- Christine Ann Jeffery, chair, Skills Group UK Ltd. For services to skills training and charity.
- David Ellis Jenkins. For services to maritime safety.
- Philippa Helen Dodds John. For services to young people and culture in London.
- Sian Bassett John, lately Chief Security Strategist, Symantec Corporation. For services to cyber security.
- Anthony Colin Johnson, Chair of Governors, Oaklands Primary School, Yeovil, Somerset. For services to education.
- Shahina Baloch Johnson. For services for the arts and creative industries in Swindon and Wiltshire.
- Elizabeth Anne Johnston. For voluntary service to the community in Donaghadee, County Down.
- Carly Jayne Jones. For services to people with autism.
- Karen Jones. For services to children with life-limiting illnesses in the North West and North Wales.
- Peter Jones, National Account Manager, National Employer and Partnership Team, Department for Work and Pensions. For services to unemployed people.
- Rowena Wendy Jones, Paediatric Oncology Outreach Specialist Nurse, Hywel Dda University Health Board. For services to sick and disabled children and end of life care.
- Trevor John Jones. For services to the community in Stoke-on-Trent, Staffordshire.
- Mohammad Yaqub Joya. For services to the army and the Muslim community in Northern Ireland.
- Shirley Kankowski, Project Manager, HM Revenue and Customs. For services to state pension reform.
- Andrew Charles Kaufman. For services to Holocaust education.
- Dorothy Harriet Keane, Clinical Lead, E-Learning for Healthcare Image Interpretation Project, Society of Radiographers. For services to radiography.
- Kathleen Keillor, Governor, Caroline Haslett Primary School. For services to education.
- Susan Stephen Kennedy, lately National Co-ordinator, General Practice Nursing in NHS Education Scotland. For services to general practice nurse education.
- Alexander Khan, chief executive officer, Lifetime Training. For services to apprenticeships.
- Sadi (Mehmood Sajdah) Khan. For services to cultural/religious awareness training and voluntary service to vulnerable women.
- Ronald George Knight, co-founder, Knight Farm Machinery Limited and Harvesting Machinery Historian. For services to agricultural engineering entrepreneurship and charitable fundraising.
- Geoffrey Arthur Knights. For services to the community in High Kelling, Norfolk.
- Reverend Bernd Koschland. For services to Holocaust education.
- Dr. Susan Elizabeth Kruse. For services to community archaeology in the Highlands of Scotland.
- Grace Ladoja. For services to music.
- Gillian Lane, lately vice-chair of Governors, Central College Nottingham and Governor, Acorn Primary Federation. For services to education.
- Mark Ralph Langshaw, managing director, Continental Teves Ltd. For services to the economy and community in Blaenau Gwent.
- Ganiyu Laniyan, managing director, Shian. For services to the community in London.
- John Larke TD. For services to music in Cornwall.
- Susan Florence Moyes Law, chair, Muirfield Riding Therapy. For services to riding for disabled people.
- Rosemary Leach, Principal Lecturer, Sport Development, Sheffield Hallam University. For services to education.
- Ivy Agnes Lee. For services to Girlguiding in Northern Ireland.
- Michele Ganley Lee, chair, Dyspraxia Foundation Charity. For services to improving the diagnosis and treatment of children with dyspraxia.
- Professor Michael Levin, Professor, Paediatrics and International Child Health, Imperial College London and St Mary's Hospital. For services to infectious disease critical care and research.
- Alison Lewis, Site Lead, HM Revenue and Customs. For public service.
- Christopher David Lewis, Lifeguard, RNLI. For services to maritime safety.
- Hannah Lewis. For services to Holocaust education.
- Leonie Rachelle Lewis. For services to the Jewish community in London.
- Robert Joseph Stanley Long. For services to the community in Maldon, Essex.
- Christopher Charles Loveday. For services to children, to people with mental health issues and the community in Swindon.
- Elizabeth Ann Lovesey. For services to education and the community in Great Barford, Bedfordshire.
- Deborah Karen Lovett (BASS), Director of Export and Trade Finance, Credit Agricole Corporate and Investment Bank. For services to exports.
- Timothy James Lovett, Director of Public Affairs, British Beekeepers Association. For services to the beekeeping industry.
- Carol Lukins. For services to HM Coastguard and the Prison Service.
- Margaret Ann Lynch. For political service.
- Inez Therese Philomena Alice Lynn. For services to literature and libraries in London.
- James Jamieson Lyon, Forest Management Director, Forestry Commission. For services to forestry and to conservation in the North East.
- Katherine Mary (Kay) MacKay, chair, Isle of Lewis Local Committee, Cancer Research UK. For services to charitable fundraising.
- Sine Cameron MacVicar, lately Headteacher, Dunbeg Primary School. For services to education and the community in Dunbeg, Argyll.
- Roisin Maguire, lately Principal, St Joseph's College, Stoke-on-Trent. For services to education.
- Sajda Majeed. For services to the community in Burnley.
- Suzanne Marie Marklew, Senior Executive Officer. Foreign Liaison Staff (Army), Ministry of Defence. For services to defence engagement.
- Ian George Marks. For services to the community in Warrington, Cheshire.
- Lucy Marks, chief executive officer and Clinical Psychologist, Compass Wellbeing. For services to children's mental health and primary care.
- Margaret Patricia Martin. For voluntary service to road safety in Northern Ireland.
- Anthony Marwood, Violinist. For services to classical music.
- Margaret Mather, Founder, Dundee Junior Showtime Youth Theatre. For services to the arts and community in Dundee.
- John Bernard Roger Matthews, Trustee, Heart Your Smile. For services to dentistry.
- Linda Jane McAuley Wilson, Presenter, BBC Radio Ulster. For services to consumers in Northern Ireland.
- Thomas Adrian McAuley. For services to first aid and healthcare in Northern Ireland.
- Thomas Celestine McBride, Head, Department for Business Services, South West College. For services to further education in Northern Ireland.
- Margaret Lynne McCabe, Head, Welsh Tribunals Unit. For services to administrative justice in Wales.
- Daniel McCallum, co-founder and managing director, Awel Aman Tawe. For services to community energy in Wales.
- Hazel Roberta McCready. For services to disabled ex-police officers in Northern Ireland.
- Angus James McIntosh, managing director, Lecht Ski Centre. For services to skiing and tourism in North East Scotland.
- John Stuart McLester. For services to education and the community in Monmouth.
- Stefa Janita McManners. For services to the community in County Durham.
- Robert Duncan McPhail. For services to the community in Tarbert, Argyll.
- Donald Wallace McPhie, National Trustee and Regional Representative, West Midlands, SSAFA. For voluntary service to ex-service personnel.
- Carolyn Anne McVittie, managing director, Stepahead. For services to children and families.
- Bazil Leonard Duncan Meade, London Community Gospel Choir. For services to the development of British gospel music.
- Jennifer Meakin. For services to children with disabilities, particularly through sport.
- Thomas Frederic Metcalfe. For services to bell ringing in Cumbria.
- Detective Constable Garry Millar, Police Service of Northern Ireland. For services to policing and the community in Northern Ireland.
- Professor Mark Andrew Miodownik, Professor of Materials Science, University College London. For services to science, engineering and broadcasting.
- Christine Valerie Mitchell, Account Manager, Department for International Trade. For services to international trade.
- Gillian Moglione. For services to the community in Liverpool.
- Moira Anne Monaghan, lately Head Teacher, Bushes Primary School, Paisley. For services to education in Renfrewshire.
- Margaret Gilmour Wilson Moodie, lately volunteer, St Columba's. For services to people with life-limiting illnesses and to deaf people in Scotland.
- Henry Joseph Moore TD. For services in support of the Northern Ireland peace process.
- Sandra Moore, chief executive officer, Welcome Organisation. For services to tackling homelessness.
- Rachel Duncan Morgan. For services to UK Antarctic heritage and conservation.
- Constable Richard Hugh Morgan, South Wales Police. For charitable services to armed forces veterans.
- Elizabeth Julie Morris, Headteacher, Severn Primary School, Cardiff. For services to education.
- Margaret Anne Morris. For services to health and wellbeing in Salford.
- Richard Morris, lately Senior Head of Service, Children and Family Courts Advisory and Support Service. For services to children in England.
- Karen Vivienne Morrison. For services to the children's hearings system in Scotland and the community in North Lanarkshire.
- Michael Cecil Moss. For services to golf, tourism and charity in Northern Ireland.
- Alison Moth. For services to education in Northern Ireland.
- Sylvia Doreen Moys, Member, Court of Common Council. For services to the City of London corporation and education in Croydon.
- Ann Stewart Muir, Volunteer, MacMillan Cancer Voice. For services to people affected by cancer in Scotland.
- Eric Eugene Murangwa. For services to raising awareness of the Rwandan genocide.
- Kenneth John Nelson, chief executive officer, LEDCOM. For services to economic development and the voluntary sector.
- Edward Augustus Nestor. For services to radio and to charity.
- Moira Newton. For services to the Jewish community in North London.
- Peter John Wellesley Noble. For services to photography and to charity.
- Alison Elizabeth North, Teacher and Choir Leader, Lindley Junior School, Huddersfield. For services to education.
- Josephine Maria O'Farrell. For services to the community in Crowthorne and Bridport, Dorsetshire.
- David George Openshaw. For services to music in Northern Ireland.
- Professor Gerard Patrick Parr. For services to developing telecoms infrastructure in Northern Ireland.
- Janet Elizabeth Parrott. For voluntary political service.
- Dr. Bernard Neil Parsons, co-founder and chief executive officer, Becrypt. For services to digital technology.
- Atulkumar Bhogilal Patel. For services to heritage and the community in the East Midlands.
- Mubeen Yunus Patel, Administrative Officer, Personal Tax Operations, HM Revenue and Customs. For services to public sector digital transformation programme.
- Robert Ian Paterson. For services to Paralympic sport.
- Desmond George Arthur Payne, Master Distiller, Beefeater London Dry Gin. For services to the British gin industry.
- Bernadette Peers, Compliance Manager, Strategic Shipping Ltd. For services to export control.
- Major (retired) Donald Peploe, Staff Officer, Army Equipment Support, Ministry of Defence. For services to military capability.
- Clifford Edward Perry, Business Coordinator, Railway Division, Institution of Mechanical Engineers. For services to railways.
- Janice Pettit. For services to youth work and the community in the London Borough of Waltham Forest.
- Marcella Eileen Phelan. For services to young people in Ealing, London.
- Helen Margaret Phillips. For services to Welsh gymnastics and the Commonwealth Games Council for Wales.
- Martin Graham Highmore Phipps, Harbour Master. For services to UK exports.
- David Pickering, Education Administrator and Teacher, the Royal Ballet. For services to the arts and education.
- Michael John Pipes, lately School Governor, Hampshire. For services to education.
- Susan Platten, Bedfordshire and Hertfordshire business and partnership manager, Department for Work and Pensions. For services to young people.
- Timothy Michael Staden Pocock. For services to education and charity.
- Kathryn Podmore, lately Principal, Birkenhead Sixth Form College. For services to education.
- Diana Lois Porter, Founder, Fresh Start-New Beginnings. For services to sexually abused children, young people and their families.
- Stephen Philip Prenter. For services to arts, business and education.
- Michael Julian Prior, Commercial Officer, Military Flying Training System Programme, Ministry of Defence. For services to military training provision.
- Adrian John Prior-Sankey. For services to the community in Taunton, Somerset.
- Captain (retired) Santa Pun, Staff Officer, Army Division, Defence Academy. For services to defence.
- Naeem Rabbani Qureshi. For services to the community in Sparkbrook, Birmingham.
- Dr. Robert Ramdhanie. For services to dance.
- Dr. Michael John Rance. For services to the community in Macclesfield, Cheshire.
- Dorothy Anne Rand. For services to local government and the community in Durham.
- Gurmit Singh Randhawa. For services to community cohesion in the Vale of Glamorgan.
- Linda Mary Ransom. For services to the community in East London and Essex.
- Andrew Rowland Ready, Senior Surgeon, Renal Transplant Programmes, University Hospital Birmingham. For services to renal transplantation.
- Alan Regin. For services to campanology and its heritage.
- Allan Martin Russell Reid. For services to the community in Winchester, Hampshire.
- Ann Lorraine Reid, Councillor, City of York Council. For services to local government.
- Patricia Ann Reid, Secretary, Dunfermline Tennis Club. For services to tennis and lacrosse in Scotland.
- Stefanie McLeod Reid. For services to Paralympic sport.
- Janet Elizabeth Riches. For political and public service.
- Watch Manager Christine Elizabeth Robson, County Durham and Darlington Fire and Rescue Service. For services to the fire and rescue service and the community in County Durham.
- Dr. James Peter Robson, Doctor, Scotland National Rugby Team and Head of Medical Services, Scottish Rugby Union. For services to rugby.
- Louise Mary Rooney, Senior Nurse, Head of Prison Healthcare, HM Prison Usk. For services to nursing and prison healthcare in Monmouthshire.
- Paula Roots, Group Manager, Early Years and Early Intervention, West Lothian Council. For services to the community in West Lothian.
- Carolyn Ann Roseberry-Sparkes, deputy director, Border Force, Home Office. For services to border security.
- Dr. Nicholas Andrew Nesbitt Rowe, Director of Converge, York St John University. For services to people with mental ill health in Yorkshire and the North East.
- Linda Ruth Rowles, Personal Assistant to Directors for Higher Education Reform, Department for Education. For services to education and to the community in bromley.
- Professor Helen Elizabeth Roy, Group Leader, Population Ecology, Centre for Ecology and Hydrology. For services to biodiversity research, science communication and citizen science.
- Leslie Ann Roy. For services to athletics in Scotland.
- Sean Edward Ryan, Volunteer, St Monica's Flixton Parish, Manchester. For services to refugee resettlement.
- Watch Manager Simon Charles Ryder, Greater Manchester Fire and Rescue Service. For voluntary service to the Manchester Children's Burns Camp and Northern Burns Care Network.
- Joan Salter. For services to Holocaust education.
- Joan Mary Sanger. For services to charity and the community in Beckingham, South Yorkshire.
- Dr. Mehool Harshadray Sanghrajka. For services to the Jain faith and education.
- Jeffrey Scorah, Ministry of Defence. For services to defence.
- Neil Duncan Scott, Project Support Officer, Department for Business, Energy and Industrial Strategy. For public service.
- Dr. Martin Pengton Seah, Emeritus Senior Fellow in Surface and Nanoanalysis, National Physical Laboratory. For services to measurement science.
- Keith Dennis Sears, lately Inspector, Sports Ground Safety Authority. For services to sport.
- Diana Joyce Seeney. For services to the Girls' Brigade.
- Shyamal Kanti Sengupta. For services to interfaith relations in Renfrewshire.
- William Robert Sergeant QPM, County vice-chairman, Merseyside and West Lancashire, Royal British Legion. For voluntary service to ex-service personnel and to First World War remembrance.
- Professor Vikas Sagar Shah, Member, Industrial Development Advisory Board and chief executive officer, Swiscot Group. For services to business and the economy.
- Summera Naheed Shaheen, Owner, the Diamond Studio. For services to business and the community in Glasgow.
- Dr. Rohit Shankar, Consultant in Adult Developmental Psychiatry, Cornwall Partnership NHS Foundation Trust. For services to people with learning disabilities in Cornwall.
- Anne Florence May Shaw, Foster carer, Sheffield City Council. For services to children and families.
- Margaret Ann Shields, Administrative Assistant, Ministry of Defence. For services to defence.
- Patricia Anne Shore. For services to the community in Harrogate.
- Dr. Sanjiv Kumar Shridhar, General Practitioner, Nantwich, Cheshire. For services to primary care.
- Anya Shrubsole. For services to cricket.
- Hazel Marie Simmons. For services to local government in Luton.
- Colin Ian Angus Skeath, lately Neighbourhood Inspector, West Yorkshire Police. For services to policing and the community in Halifax.
- Frances Jane Sloan, chair, Aldouran Wetland Garden. For voluntary service in Leswalt, Wigtownshire.
- Emma Louise Smith, Head of Operations, National Crime Agency. For services to tackling economic crime.
- Jeffrey Douglas Reginald Smith, Founder, Ards Peninsula First Responders Group. For services to health in Northern Ireland.
- Raymond John Smith, Ceremonial Technical Officer, House of Commons. For services to Parliament.
- Susan Smith, Joint Chief Executive, South Northamptonshire and Cherwell District Councils. For services to local government.
- Wendy Jane Smith, Community Engagement Strategic Lead, Peninsula School of Dentistry. For services to oral healthcare and dental education in the South West.
- Jonathan William Spencer, Head of Planning and Environment, Forest Enterprise England. For services to woodlands, nature conservation and the environment.
- Peter Stewart Spencer, Adviser, Environment Agency. For services to flood hydrology and the economy.
- Dr. Andrew Spiers, Director of Science and Technology, Ardingly College. For services to education.
- Michael George Squire, Foster carer, Wiltshire Council. For services to children and families.
- Rachel Denise Squire, Foster carer, Wiltshire Council. For services to children and families.
- Dr. Seema Srivastava, Safety Programme and Falls Lead, North Bristol NHS Trust. For services to improving quality and patient safety.
- David Leonardus Steenvoorden, Superintendent Coxswain, Humber Lifeboat Station, RNLI. For services to maritime safety.
- Professor William Stephens, University Secretary and Head, Executive Office, Cranfield University. For services to higher education.
- Dr. Martin Adam Stern. For services to Holocaust education.
- Alison Rosemary Stewart. For services to libraries in Suffolk.
- David Arthur Stone. For services to young people and the community in Wolverton, Warwickshire.
- Freda Streeter. For services to open water swimming.
- Paul Anthony Strothers, lately chief executive officer, Zodiac Seats (UK) Ltd. For services to the development of aerospace manufacturing in the UK.
- Deborah Alison Sugg. For political and public service.
- Madeleine Sumption, Director, Migration Observatory, University of Oxford. For services to social science.
- Bryan James Sutherland, Engineer, Loganair. For services to the Orkney Air Service.
- Claudette Joyce Sutton, lately chief executive officer, Minority Ethnic Talent Association. For services to diversity in the civil service.
- Rosamund Anne Sweet, Police Community Support Officer, City of London Police. For services to policing and the community in the City of London.
- Dr. Melinda Tan, Rector, University of Central Lancashire Cyprus Branch Campus. For services to British higher education overseas and the promotion of bi-communal relations in Cyprus.
- Elizabeth Tappenden, Owner and Founder, in to Biz Ltd. For services to small business start-ups and women in business on the Isle of Wight.
- Angela Tate, Probation Officer, HM Prison Isle of Wight. For services to probationers and voluntary work to the community on the Isle of Wight.
- Patrick Francis Benjamin (Ben) Tatham. For services to the community in the Mole Valley, Surrey.
- Suzanne Jane Taylor. For services to education.
- David Anthony Temple, musical director, Crouch End Festival Chorus. For services to music.
- Gerald Robert Tessier, Review Manager, Boundary Commission for England, Cabinet Office. For services to democracy.
- David Thomas. For services to social work education and people with disabilities.
- Elizabeth Ann Patricia Thomas, Group Leader, Bereavement Service, Gloucestershire. For services to supporting people bereaved by suicide in Gloucestershire.
- Michael Everard Thornhill. For services to the community in Leominster, Herefordshire.
- Robert Telford Tinlin, lately Chief Executive, Southend on Sea Borough Council. For services to local government in Essex.
- Professor Michael John Tipton, Professor of Human and Applied Physiology, University of Portsmouth. For services to physiological research in extreme environments.
- Stella Gladys Tomkinson. For services to foster care in Warwickshire.
- Adrian Treharne, Grade 7, Capabilities and Resources, Home Office. For services to people with disabilities in the public and charitable sectors.
- Kevin Trickett. For services to the community in Wakefield, West Yorkshire.
- Ian Nigel Tully. For services to music.
- Professor Lynne Frances Turner-Stokes, Consultant in Rehabilitation Medicine, Northwick Park NHS Trust and Herbert Dunhill Professor of Rehabilitation, King's College, University of London. For services to rehabilitation medicine.
- Professor Philippa Jane Tyrell Jones, Professor and consultant, Stroke Medicine, Salford Royal NHS Foundation Trust and University of Manchester. For services to stroke medicine and care.
- Frances Margaret Veal. For services to the community in Bridgnorth, Shropshire.
- Dr. Tracey Jayne Vell, General Practitioner, Surrey Lodge Group Practice, Greater Manchester. For services to primary care.
- John Victor Frederick Voss. For services to rugby.
- Dr. Joanna Margaret Walker, Consultant Paediatrician, Portsmouth Hospitals NHS Trust. For services to children, young people and families in Hampshire and West Sussex.
- Anne Amelia Manson Wallace, Senior Personal Secretary, Department for Communities, Northern Ireland Executive. For services to the Northern Ireland Civil Service.
- Verena Lesley Wallace, Midwife. For services to midwifery in Northern Ireland.
- David Walsh, Ministry of Defence. For services to defence.
- Dr. Jennifer Mary Walsh Cooper, Independent Research and Development Manager. For services to transmissions research and development.
- Hayley Walters, Welfare and Anaesthesia Veterinary Nurse, University of Edinburgh. For services to veterinary education and animal welfare.
- Stephen James (Steve) Waltho, lately Mayor of Dudley. For services to local government and the community in Dudley.
- Cleveland Alexander Watkiss, Jazz vocalist, actor and composer. For services to music.
- Alison Jayne Watson, chief executive officer, Class of Your Own. For services to education.
- Andrew Paul Watson, Leader, Geese Theatre Company. For services to the arts in the criminal justice system.
- William John Allen Watson. For services to cycling.
- William Duncan Watt, chairman, Wick Harbour Authority. For services to the community in Wick and Caithness.
- Edward John Watts. For services to the scouting movement, mission to seafarers and community cohesion in South Wales.
- Derek Weaver, Curator, Marine Engineering Museum, HMS Sultan. For voluntary service to naval heritage.
- James Lewis West, lately Head, Product Assurance, AWE Aldermaston. For services to nuclear safety.
- Christopher John Whiteside. For political and public service.
- Derrick John Willer, Schools Liaison Officer, Institution of Engineering and Technology. For services to education.
- Cheryl Barbara Williams, Director, Yorkshire Wildlife Park and Chief Executive, Yorkshire Wildlife Park Foundation. For services to business and conservation.
- James Hugh Alexander Williams. For services to the shrievalty and the community in Hertfordshire.
- Mark Williams, Manager, Investigations, Specialist Operations, National Crime Agency. For services to law enforcement.
- Martin Williams, Foster Carer, Croydon Borough Council and chair, Croydon Foster Carer Association. For services to children and families.
- Jacqueline Frances Williamson, Founder, Kinship Care Northern Ireland. For services to carers and children in Northern Ireland.
- Robert Clive Wilson, Director of Estates and Facilities, University of Bradford. For services to higher education and sustainability.
- Dr. John Albert Wood, General Practitioner, St Elizabeth's Medical Centre. For services to general practice in Leicester.
- Janet Sarah Woodroffe. For voluntary and charitable services in Wistanstow, South Shropshire.
- Barbara Ann Woodward-Carlton, chair, University of Bradford Panel for Dementia Research. For services to patient and public involvement in furthering dementia research.

Diplomatic Service and Overseas List

- Ann Aspinall, Past patron and lifetime honorary member of the British Women's Association Manila. Trustee of Stepping Stone Foundation. For services to charity and the British community in the Philippines.
- Betty Louise Baraud, Fundraiser and community volunteer, Cayman Islands. For services to the community in the Cayman Islands.
- Alison Blair, Founder and Clinical Director, Madrugada Associação, Praia da Luz, Portugal. For services to supporting people with life-limiting illness and their families in Portugal.
- Marrena Ruby Bradshaw, Chief of Staff to the Director, Middle East and North Africa Directorate, Foreign and Commonwealth Office. For services to British foreign policy.
- Paul Broom, Political Officer, British High Commission, Singapore. For services to UK/Singapore relations.
- Jeremy Chivers, former Stabilisation Advisor, British Embassy Beirut. For services to UK/Lebanon relations.
- Patricia Coelho, First Secretary Political, British Embassy, Tunisia. For services to British foreign policy.
- Lesley Anne Hanson De Moura, lately Honorary Consul for Bahia and Sergipe, Brazil. For services to the British community in Bahia and Sergipe States in Brazil.
- Philip Oscar Dexter, Global Teacher Development Adviser, English and Exams, British Council. For services to special educational needs, equality, diversity and inclusion.
- Paul David Hamilton, Regional Security Advisor, Foreign and Commonwealth Office. For services to overseas security.
- William Nicholas Harris, Second Secretary, Foreign and Commonwealth Office. For services to national security.
- Paul Ian Hebbron, Second Secretary, Foreign and Commonwealth Office. For services to British foreign policy.
- Andrew Edward Beare Hirst, Honorary Consul, Maldonado and Rocha, Uruguay. For services to British interests in Uruguay.
- Dr. David John Hitchen, Second Secretary, Foreign and Commonwealth Office. For services to British foreign policy.
- Dr. William Hrudey, Observatory Director, University College of the Cayman Islands. For services to promoting science education in the Cayman Islands.
- Gillian Karatas, lately Head of Corporate Services, British Consulate General, Istanbul. For services to staff and families at the British Consulate General, Istanbul.
- Kerrie Louise Kearney, Second Secretary, Foreign and Commonwealth Office. For services to British foreign policy.
- Derek Ross King, Television and radio presenter. For services to broadcasting, the arts and charity.
- Dr. Vijay Kumar, Director of Public Health. For services to the Gibraltar Health Authority.
- Leila Memmi, Vice Consul, British Embassy, Tunis. For services to British victims and families of the terrorist attack in Sousse, Tunisia.
- Carol Angela Murray, Volunteer and Member of the Bahrain Anglican Church Council. For services to charity and the community in Bahrain.
- John Rolfe, Schools Outreach Manager, British Council. For services to international education.
- Adrian Donovan Short, President, Rolls-Royce Indonesia and chairman, British Chamber of Commerce. For services to UK/Indonesia trade and investment.
- Hulian Lynden Smith, lately Teacher in the British Virgin Islands. For services to developing education programmes and advocating literacy in the British Virgin Islands.
- Alan David Thomson, managing director, Abu Dhabi Sewerage Services Company. For services to the UK and global water industry and associated charities.
- Sally Mary Unsworth, Director, Cyprus Samaritans and founder of Paphos Bereavement Group. For services to charity and the British community in Cyprus.
- James Verrier, chief executive officer, BorgWarner Corporation, USA. For services to the UK automotive industry.

=== Order of the Companions of Honour (CH) ===
- The Rt. Hon. The Lord Bragg. For services to broadcasting and the arts.
- Lady Antonia Fraser DBE Author and historian. For services to literature.

Diplomatic Service and Overseas List

- Professor Margaret Olwen MacMillan, lately Warden, St Antony's College, Oxford. For services to higher education, history and international affairs.

=== British Empire Medal (BEM) ===
Civil Division

- David John Allen. For services to the community in Barnsley.
- Thomas Allen. For services to the community in Donemana, County Tyrone.
- Yasmin Jade Allen, Clinical Fellow, NHS. For services to oral health.
- Michael Anthony Amies, lately chair, Organ Donation Committee, Worcestershire Acute Hospitals NHS Trust. For services to healthcare.
- Anthony Robin Ardron. For services to people with learning difficulties in Cumbria.
- Antony Robin Brian Ashburner. For services to the community in Exford, Somerset.
- Violet Atkinson, Road Safety Volunteer, Northumbria Police. For services to road safety awareness and education in Northumberland.
- Sarah Avery Hogan, Team Manager, Child Protection and Court Team, Bath and North East Somerset Council. For services to children.
- Gertrude Ayer. For services to the community in Annfield Plain, County Durham.
- Peter Baillie, Senior Executive officer, Ministry of Defence. For services to defence and veterans.
- Ramon Lionel (Ray) Banks. For services to the community in Tiptree, Essex.
- Reginald Robert Barry. For services to the community on the Isle of Wight.
- Jack Alexander Erwin Beattie. For services to the development of sport in Lisburn, Northern Ireland.
- Mark MacLeod Beaumont. For services to sport, broadcasting and charity.
- Catherine Cicely Beech. For services to the community in Ceredigion.
- James Bell. For services to the farming community in Northern Ireland.
- Neomi Beverley Bennett, managing director, Neo-Innovations UK Ltd. For services to nursing and healthcare.
- Jean Bett. For services to education and community drama in Renfrewshire and West Dunbartonshire.
- Mark Gunter Beyer, Administrative Officer, Ministry of Defence. For services to defence and the Dartmoor Mountain Rescue Group.
- Harry Bibring. For services to Holocaust education.
- Bryan Birkett. For services to bell ringing and the community in Nottinghamshire.
- Margaret Jean Bishop. For services to Age UK and to charity.
- Elizabeth Masson Blades, Captain, 5th Motherwell Girls' Brigade. For services to young people and the community in Motherwell, Lanarkshire.
- Regina Akosua Boakye-Nimo. For services to dance.
- Terence George Bolt. For services to the community in Cornwall.
- Sonia Jane Bond. For services to dance.
- Sandra Jane Booer. For services to music and the community in Dartford.
- Eileen Borton. For services to older people in Rugby, Warwickshire.
- Alison Sara Bradbury. For services to the community in Clophill, Bedfordshire.
- Sandra Bradshaw. For services to the community in Manchester.
- Kulbir Singh Brar, Community and Diversity Officer, Thames Valley Police. For services to community cohesion.
- Andrew Robert Bromley, International Student Support Officer, Sheffield Hallam University. For services to higher education.
- Joyce Ellen Brooker. For services to the community in Wing, Buckinghamshire.
- Ann Maureen Browning, chairman, Berkhamsted Committee, the Children's Society. For charitable services.
- Frank Eric Bull. For services to the Royal British Legion and the community in Whitby.
- Derek Alan Burnett. For services to the community in Nottinghamshire.
- Margaret Cahoon, Learning Support Assistant, Knockloughrim Primary School, Magherafelt. For services to education in Northern Ireland.
- Gayle Luett Carson, Administrator, Northern Ireland Custody Visitor Scheme. For services to prisoner welfare and charity in Northern Ireland.
- Samuel Frederick Erskine (Ricky) Caruth. For services to rowing in Northern Ireland.
- Colin Russell Case. For voluntary and charitable services to the community in Ruyton Xi Towns, Shropshire.
- Anita Itallina Castellina. For services to the community in Cannock.
- Stephen Chapman. For services to music in Northern Ireland.
- Paul Clabburn, Member, London Veterans Advisory and Pensions Committee. For services to veterans and to awareness of cardiac risk.
- Susan Clarey, Office Manager, St. Anne's Church of England Primary School, Bishop Auckland. For services to education.
- Mary Clarke. For services to flood defence and the community in Cardiff.
- Jacqueline Clark-Basten. For services to the community in Sipson, Middlesex.
- Jean Clarkson. For services to riding for disabled people in Dumfries and Galloway.
- Gayle Denise Clay, Team Manager, Homeless Healthcare Team, Gloucestershire Care Services NHS Trust. For services to community health for homeless and vulnerable people.
- Richard Cleaves. For services to the community in Ewhurst, Surrey.
- Jonathan Victor Cooke. For services to cross community relations through sport in Northern Ireland.
- John Mervyn Cornish. For services to the community in Stewkley, Buckinghamshire.
- Lee Coulson. For services to disability basketball.
- John Charles Cox. For services to scouting and to Holy Trinity Church, Bradford on Avon.
- Patricia Anne Cox. For voluntary and charitable services.
- Michael Credland. For services to First World War Heritage and remembrance.
- June Mary Crew. For voluntary service to natural history and the community in Broxbourne, Hertfordshire.
- Tom Crosby, Volunteer, Network Rail Community Safety Programme. For services to railway safety.
- Diane Gail Curtis, Manager, Bowel Screening Wales. For services to cancer patients.
- Nadine Samantha Daniel. For services to interfaith and community relations in Merseyside.
- Jacqueline Rhys Davies. For services to young people in Cheshire.
- Dawn Ruth Davis, Northern Ireland Environment Agency. For voluntary services through the Samaritans.
- Wendy Elizabeth Daws. For voluntary service to visually impaired people in North Kent.
- Hamish Dean, Pipe Major, Huntly and District Pipe Band. For services to piping and the community in Aberdeenshire.
- Elizabeth Gabrielle Deans. For voluntary service to the Western Health and Social Care Trust, Northern Ireland.
- Sheila Delahoy. For services to cancer and cystic fibrosis charities in Flintshire.
- Louise Gail Dembny, Executive officer, Department for Work and Pensions. For public and charitable services.
- Leslie David Dennison DL For services to charity.
- Watch Commander David Denvir, Northern Ireland Fire and Rescue Service. For services to fire safety in Northern Ireland.
- Rosalind Jane Dolding. For services to the community in Edington and Polden Hill, Somerset.
- Theresa Mary Douglas, Police Staff, Police Service of Northern Ireland. For services to policing and the community in Northern Ireland.
- Rosemary Enid Dowie. For services to the community in Weston-super-Mare, Somerset.
- Mary Dowson. For services to community radio.
- Gregory Matthew Drozdz. For services to the community in Hinckley, Leicestershire.
- Hazel Valerie Drummond. For services to music in Northern Ireland.
- Frances Edwards. For services to the community in Bishopsteignton, Devon.
- Thomas Wallace Elder. For services to the community in Ahoghill, County Antrim.
- James Andrew Emery. For voluntary service to the Boys' Brigade and the community in County Tyrone.
- Alison Lesley Evans. For services to the community in Suffolk.
- Gareth Evans, Deputy Local Policing Inspector, South Wales Police. For services to community cohesion and engagement.
- Gordon Malcolm Evans, chairman, Stafford Town Football Club. For services to football in Stafford.
- Efe Elizabeth Ezekiel. For services to young people in London.
- Special Constable Lloyd Bartle Fairey, Northamptonshire Police. For services to policing and the community in Wootton Fields, Northampton.
- Adrian Kenneth Farmer. For services to the community in Belper and Derwent Valley, Derbyshire.
- Gay Sandra Fifield. For services to older people in South Wales.
- Susan Ann Fifield. For services to the community in Farringdon, Hampshire.
- Robert Fisher. For services to the Northern Ireland Prison Service pipes and drums band.
- William James Keith Fleming. For services to young people through the Church Lads' and Church Girls' Brigades and the Duke of Edinburgh's Award Scheme.
- Joan Marie Flynn, lately Senior Receptionist, Medical Research Council. For services to the Medical Research Council.
- Anne Danson Forbes, Refugee Resettlement Co-ordinator, Ashford Borough Council. For services to the resettlement of Syrian refugees in the UK.
- Hilary Cynthia Ford, School volunteer, Herringthorpe Junior School, Rotherham. For services to education.
- Edwin Ian Fowles, Trumpeter, Bunbury Branch, Royal British Legion. For voluntary service to ex-service personnel.
- Gregory Francis, Senior Officer, National Cyber Crime Unit, National Crime Agency. For services to law enforcement and protecting vulnerable people.
- Sabrina Alicia Francis, Social Media Officer, City, University of London. For services to the University of London.
- Margaret Louise Frost. For services to charity and the community in Bude, Cornwall.
- Stuart Alan Frost. For services to the community in Harrogate, North Yorkshire.
- Alan Futter. For services to people with visual impairments.
- Mathew Fyfe, Poppy Convener, Royal British Legion. For services to veterans in Aberdeenshire.
- Patrick James Gaul. For voluntary service in Turriff, Aberdeenshire.
- Bernard Oswyn George. For services to Withybush Hospital Chemotherapy Day Unit, Pembrokeshire.
- Patricia Elizabeth George. For services to Withybush Hospital Chemotherapy Day Unit, Pembrokeshire.
- Teifwen Mary George. For services to equality, young people, charity and the community in Merthyr Tydfil.
- Mary Bernadette Glass. For services to nursing and the community in the Causeway Area, Northern Ireland.
- Mary Sydney Grace. For services to the community in Crawley, West Sussex.
- Aonghas William Grant. For services to fiddling and music tuition in the Highlands.
- David Edward Gravell. For services to charity, sport and education in Wales.
- Jenny Griffiths. For services to Wrexham Maelor Hospital, North Wales.
- Lesley Ann Hall. For services to education.
- Isabella Turnbull Halliday, Fundraiser, Children's Hospices Across Scotland. For services to charity.
- Benjamin David Hammond. For services to dance and charity.
- Peter George Thomson Hardie, badminton and tennis coach. For services to sport and young people in the Scottish Borders.
- Celia Hargrave. For services to charity and the community in Sheepscombe, Gloucestershire.
- Roberta June Harrington, Education Officer, Chelmsford Cathedral, Essex. For services to education.
- Margaret Mary Harvie. For services to music in Dumfries and Galloway.
- Judith Haycocks, Healthcare Assistant, Whitchurch Community Hospital, Shropshire Community Health NHS Trust. For services to care of older people.
- Kathryn Jane Heyworth. For services to the community in Burnley.
- Emmelence Irivuzimana Higgins, Manager, Barlochan Care Home. For services to older people in Castle Douglas, Dumfries and Galloway.
- Henry Arnold Hill, Tailor to the Royal Navy and Royal Marines. For services to naval personnel.
- Dr. Norman Wesley Francis Berkeley Hill. For services to music in Kent.
- Roselyn Hirst, Senior Chief Cardiac Physiologist, Manchester Royal Infirmary. For services to the NHS.
- Pauline May Hodgetts. For services to the community in Tipton, West Midlands.
- Colin Brendan Holloway, Field Force Collector, Debt Management, HM Revenue and Customs. For voluntary services to young people.
- Jean Holmes. For services to choral music in Nottinghamshire.
- Lisa Jane Horder, Domestic Abuse Champion, British Forces Germany, Ministry of Defence. For services to the Armed Forces and their families in Germany.
- Gail Louise Humphreys, Troubled Families Lead, Liverpool City Council. For services to troubled families in Liverpool.
- James George Hurst, Administrative Officer, Compliance Operations Processing, HM Revenue and Customs. For voluntary and charitable services in Salford.
- Caroline Anne Husain. For services to charity and the community in Chandlers Ford, Hampshire.
- Percy Edwin Iles. For services to RAF veterans and the community in Basingstoke, Hampshire.
- Adrian Mark Jacobs, Volunteer, Police Liaison, Metropolitan Police Service. For services to interfaith relations and the community in the London Borough of Barnet.
- Robert Walker James. For services to the community in Hungerford, Berkshire.
- Margaret Harvey Jamieson, Founder, the Blue Door. For services to the community and charity in Orkney.
- Patricia Jardine. For services to charity through the Annan and District Group of Friends, Dumfries and Galloway.
- Yvonne Margaret Jardine. For services to the community in Sleaford, Lincolnshire.
- Annwen Selima Amoret Johnson, Correspondence Manager, HM Treasury. For service to diversity and inclusion.
- Betty Irene Johnson, Visiting Assistant, the Royal Star and Garter Home. For voluntary service to veterans.
- Brenda Johnston. For services to swimming and the community in Grimsby.
- Bryan Stanley Jones. For services to education and young people.
- Gareth Jones. For services to church communities in Skewen and Neath, South West Wales.
- Helena Jones. For services to young people and the community in Wales.
- Buldev Kaur Angela Kandola, Founder, AWAAZ charity. for services to Vulnerable People with Mental Health Issues.
- Geoffrey Miles Keating, Founder and Conductor, Solway Sinfonia. For services to music and charity in Dumfries and Galloway.
- John Roger Kennedy. For services to the community in St Bees and West Cumberland.
- Sarah Gertrude (Sally) Kennedy. For services to the community in St Bees and West Cumberland.
- Yvonne Teresa Key, Main Reception Coordinator, Queen's Medical Centre. For services to the community in Nottingham.
- Leslie Kleinman. For services to Holocaust education.
- Maria Kovacevic-Thomas. For services to the national health service and voluntary service in Merthyr Tydfil.
- Philip Colin Kyle. For services to young people and the community in Northern Ireland.
- Janet Eve Lake. For services to the community in Brancaster, Norfolk.
- Sister Mary-Joy Langdon. For services to disabled and disadvantaged children.
- John Law. For services to the community in Coldstream, Scottish Borders.
- Elizabeth June Lawrence. For services to the community in Morton, Shropshire.
- Angeline Margaret Lawson. For services to children, the judiciary and the community in Denbighshire.
- Sonia Jean Lewis, Alderman. For services to the community in Colchester, Essex.
- Kathryn Angela Maria Ann Livingston, Founder, First Person Plural Charity. For services to people with dissociative identity disorder.
- Ann Maria Loader. For services to charity and the community in Tickenham, North Somerset.
- Elizabeth MacColl. For voluntary service in North Berwick.
- John MacLean, chairman, Peterhead Branch, RAF Association. For voluntary service to ex-service personnel.
- John Madden, Principal, Roddensvale School. For services to the community in Larne, County Antrim.
- Eileen Mary Magee. For services to Cheltenham Croquet Club and the community in Hartpury, Gloucestershire.
- Subhash Chander Mahajan. For services to the community in Hounslow.
- Ellen Maisie Mann, Nurse, Cwm Taf University Health Board. For services to children and young people.
- James Donald Manning. For services to young people and the community in Ipswich.
- Andrea Manson. For voluntary service to disability sport.
- Giles William Margarson. For services to the community in Aylsham, Norfolk.
- Jennifer Susan Marlow. For services to vulnerable people in the community in Alton, Hampshire.
- Richard Marriott, Fundraiser, RNLI. For charitable services.
- Andrew Neil Marshallsay, Fire Service Trainer, Hertfordshire Fire and Rescue Service. For voluntary service to the fire cadets unit and the Fire Service Touth Training Association.
- George Edwin Martin, Train Manager, CrossCountry Trains and Founder, Myra's Wells. For services to charity.
- William John Matheson. For services to music, culture and charity in the Highlands.
- Norman Mawhinney. For services to running and the community in Comber, County Down.
- Ann Margaret Mayer. For services to the community in Bollington, Cheshire.
- Clare Beatrice McCarthy, Member, London and South Region, St John Fellowship. For voluntary service to first aid.
- Fiona McCormack. For services to children and young adults with special educational needs in Essex, Hertfordshire and London.
- Margaret Patricia McDonald. For services to young people through the Dunmurry Girls' Brigade and to the community in Lisburn, Northern Ireland.
- Veronica McDonald, Club Leader, Firpark Alma Group. For services to adults with special needs in North Lanarkshire.
- Jennifer Mary McGregor-Smith. For services to the community in Bromsgrove.
- Alistair McInnes, Civilian Assistant, Gwent and Powys Army Cadet Force. For voluntary service to young people.
- Elaine Davidson McIntee, Physiotherapy Technical Instructor, Douglas Grant Rehabilitation Centre, Irvine. For services to holistic rehabilitation in Ayrshire.
- Alan McIntosh DL Company captain, 1st Buckie Company. For services to the Boys' Brigade.
- Jennifer Kay McIntosh, Officer in Charge, Anchor Boys, 1st Buckie Company. For services to the Boys' Brigade.
- Barbara McKinley, Company Secretary, Ulster Orchestra. For services to culture in Northern Ireland.
- Selma Anne McMullan. For services to young people through the Girls' Brigade in Ballycastle, County Antrim.
- Jeanette McMurray, Police Staff, Police Service of Northern Ireland. For services to policing and the community in Northern Ireland.
- Sarah Reeman McNamara. For services to the community in Terling, Essex.
- Iris Phoebe McSwigin. For services to charity and community relations in Fivemiletown, County Tyrone.
- Heather Mealing. For services to people with disabilities and their carers in Leeds and East Sussex.
- Lucia Quinney Mee. For services to promoting public awareness about organ donation.
- Andrew Menmuir, Group Scout Leader, Tannadice Scout Group. For services to the scouting movement in Angus.
- John Robert Middleton, lately Facilities Manager, School of Physics and Astronomy, University of Nottingham. For services to higher education and science.
- Sheila Miller, Volunteer, Leeds Teaching Hospitals NHS Trust. For services to the community in Leeds.
- Gillian Ward Milne, Senior Dental Nurse, Department of Oral and Maxillofacial Surgery, Ninewells Hospital, Dundee. For services to maxillofacial surgery patients in Tayside.
- Dean John Milton. For voluntary service to young people and charitable fundraising.
- William David Alexander Mitchell. For services to the community in County Down.
- Colin John Moore. For services to music in East Sussex.
- Jo-Ann Moran, Senior Executive officer, Home Office. For services to people with disabilities in the public sector.
- Judith Morris, Unit Manager, Halesowen Young Persons Service Unit, St John Ambulance. For voluntary service to first aid and to young people.
- Patricia (Patsy) Morrison, Founder and managing director, Universal Comedy. For services to comedy, people with long-term health conditions and charity.
- Rachel Morrison. For services to the community in Portstewart, County Londonderry.
- Helen Arrol Morton, Childline Volunteer, NSPCC. For services to children and young people.
- Janice Inglis Moss. For voluntary services and for fundraising for the Christie Hospital, Manchester.
- Peter Francis Mulligan. For services to archery and the arts in Northern Ireland.
- Diana Stella Murdie. For services to sport for visually impaired people.
- Peter Neild. For services to the community in Maghull, Merseyside.
- Elizabeth Mary (Elma) Nelson. For services to the community in Maguiresbridge, County Fermanagh.
- Hayley Angela Rhodes Nelson. For services to digital inclusion in Sheffield.
- Lucy Nkwameni Njomo. For services to vulnerable young people on the dangers of female genital mutilation.
- Jean O'Hanlon, Caseworker, Northumberland Branch, SSAFA. For voluntary service to ex-service personnel and to the community in Alnwick, Northumberland.
- Ernest O'Hara. For services to agriculture and the community in Northern Ireland.
- Alex Peter Oliver. For services to charity and the community in Durham.
- Dr. Chaim Olmer. For services to Holocaust education.
- Rebekah Mary Olphert, Founder and artistic director, Ballymena Chamber Orchestra. For services to music.
- Francis Peter George Osborn, Civilian Instructor, Bexley and Lewisham Sea Cadets. For voluntary service to young people.
- Jane Claire Owen, Train Running Controller, Network Rail. For services to the LGBT community.
- Melanie Jane Petrina Parker. For services to Girlguiding and the Royal British Legion.
- Martin Richard Parry. For services to film, media and music.
- Ann Marjorie Francescia Pembroke. For services to the cultural history of the City of London.
- Josef Perl. For services to Holocaust education.
- Hugh Raymond Phillips. For services to gymnastics.
- Sandra Elizabeth Plasting, Manager and Matron, Queen's House Nursing and Residential Home. For services to older people and the community in the Scottish Borders.
- Avril Pollock. For services to the community in Strabane, County Tyrone.
- Samuel Pollock. For services to the community in Northern Ireland.
- Christine Pratt. For services to the community in Blurton, Stoke-on-Trent.
- Patrick Joseph Prunty. For services to the Lough Neagh rescue service.
- Elfyn Pugh. For voluntary service to rugby.
- Manju Rajawat, Higher Officer, Border Force, Home Office. For services to border security.
- Robert Ramsey. For services to schools and youth football in Northern Ireland.
- Dr. Suryadevara Yadu Purna Chandra Prasad Rao, lately chair, Stoke-on-Trent Clinical Commissioning Group. For services to health and care.
- Phyllis Martha Kathleen Reeve. For services to Basildon Hospital.
- Phoebe Ethel Revill-Johnson, Secretary and treasurer, Leeds Branch, National Association of Retired Police Officers. For voluntary service to police officers.
- Alison Margaret Reynolds. For services to community sport in Kent.
- Gillian Mary Rhodes. For services to digital inclusion in Sheffield.
- Elvet Owen Richards. For services to the community in Trelystan, Powys.
- Terry Stephen Ridgley, Welfare Officer, Buckinghamshire Fire and Rescue Service. For services to the fire and rescue service and the fire fighters charity.
- William Robert Roberts. For services to in community in Ty'n-y-Groes, Conwy.
- Mary Gertrude Robinson. For services to nursing.
- Steven Michael Robinson. For services to people with disabilities and the community in West Yorkshire.
- Stuart Christopher Rose. For services to the Multiple Sclerosis Society in Scotland.
- Paul David Roy, Vice President, the Spinal Injuries Association. For voluntary service to healthcare.
- Hayley Louise Ryan, Teaching Innovation Manager, Southampton City College. For services to education.
- Janet Ryles. For services to the community in Aston-on-Trent, Derbyshire.
- Julie Elizabeth Salmon. For services to charitable fundraising and the community in the Wirral.
- Robert John Savage, Caretaker, Southern Regional College, Greenbank Campus. For services to further education in Northern Ireland.
- Alfred George Scorer. For services to the community in Ellesmere Port, Cheshire.
- Elizabeth Pauline Scott, Crossing Patrol Warden, Alloway Primary School. For services to education in Ayrshire.
- Thomas Richard Scott. For voluntary service to the Ulster Special Constabulary Association.
- Carl Jonathan Scrivens. For services to the community in Glenridding, Cumbria.
- Nancie Caroline Shackleton, lately Assistant Chief Officer (Resources), Lincolnshire Police. For services to policing and to charity.
- Paul Terence Sheehy, Driver, Government Car Service. For public service.
- Janet Mary Shephard, Trustee, the Sunrise Appeal. For services to cancer care in Cornwall.
- Elizabeth Joan Shipton. For services to the community in South Derbyshire.
- Adele Ellen Silvey, Volunteer, Thames Valley Hospice. For services to hospice patients.
- Daryl Jon Simpson. For services to community relations and peace and reconciliation in Northern Ireland.
- Joan Edna Simpson. For services to the community in Coningsby, Lincolnshire.
- Arthur Roy Skellington. For services to the community in Gedling, Nottinghamshire.
- Jeanette Lavon Smith, County Youth Officer, West Glamorgan, St John Ambulance. For voluntary service to first aid and to young people.
- Maureen Smith, Operations Manager, Facility for Airborne Atmospheric Measurements. For services to atmospheric science and meteorology.
- Ronald Scott Smith. For voluntary service to Harmeny School, the Seagull Trust and the community in Midlothian.
- Amy Margaret Smyton. For services to local government and the community in Omagh, County Tyrone.
- Susan Mary Sollis. For services to leukaemia research.
- Asish Jaidev Soni. For voluntary and charitable services to homeless people in London.
- Michael John Speight. For services to the community in Rotherham.
- Susan Spence. For voluntary service to rugby.
- Nicola Jane Spencer. For services to the arts in London.
- Harry Spiro. For services to Holocaust education.
- Karen Squires. For services to the community in Sheffield.
- David Stark, Pipe Major. For voluntary service to piping in South Lanarkshire.
- Margaret Elizabeth Stead, Voluntary Worker, Breast Cancer Research Action Group, Leeds. For services to women with breast cancer in West Yorkshire.
- Lisa Ann Stephenson, Founder, Lisa's Challenge for Maggie's. For services to Maggie's Cancer Care Scotland.
- Maryon Stewart, Founder, Angelus Foundation. For services to drug education.
- Elizabeth Macphail Stoddart. For services to the community in Lanarkshire.
- The Reverend Deacon Roger Stone, Apostleship of the Seas Port Chaplain. For services to seafarers.
- Eileen Thelma Strange. For voluntary service to the Seven Towers Male Voice Choir.
- Dr. Sarah Louise Stringer, Honorary Lecturer, King's College London. For services to psychiatry and equality in mental healthcare.
- Marilyn (Marsie) Stuart, Founder, Sign and Be Heard. For services to British Sign Language education.
- Margaret Janet Sutton, chair, Mount Vernon Hospital Comforts Fund, Hillingdon Hospital NHS Foundation Trust. For services to the NHS.
- Deviesh Tankaria, International Youth Chairman, Sathya Sai International Organisation. For voluntary service.
- Geoffrey Taylor. For services to the Scouts and the community in Chester.
- Joyce Taylor. For services to Durham Cathedral.
- Stephen Terence Taylor. For services to the community in Midsomer Norton, Somerset.
- Sheila Lynnette Thomas. For services to music, education and the Welsh language in Powys.
- David Thompson. For services to the community in Billingshurst, West Sussex.
- John Charles Thompson, Administrative Officer, Detection Technology Management Unit, Border Force South and Europe, Home Office. For services to border security.
- Martin Piers Grant Thompson, Higher Officer, Border Force, Home Office. For services to border security.
- Robert James Hamilton Thornberry. For services to young people through the Boys' Brigade in Northern Ireland.
- Lillian Thornton. For services to local government and the community in County Fermanagh.
- Joanna Tindall. For voluntary service to the Pony Club.
- Lisa Tookey. For voluntary service.
- Mary Edith Toward. For political service in the North East of England.
- James Travis. For services to the community in Silkstone, South Yorkshire.
- Roy William Tricker. For services to heritage in Suffolk.
- Robert John Trimble, Chief Executive and Team Leader, the Bromley by Bow Centre. For services to the economy.
- Lisa Mariane Turner. For services to the community in the Four Churches Benefice, South Cambridgeshire.
- Patricia Catherine Venton, Business Manager, Camelsdale Primary School. For services to education.
- Alfred Shaun Vickers. For voluntary service to sport in Tower Hamlets.
- Dr. Margaret Ruth Vincent. For charitable services in the UK and abroad and the community in Swansea.
- Graham John Wadley. For services to church music.
- Marion Maitland (Morag) Wallace. For voluntary service in Falkirk and Stirlingshire.
- Bernadette Mary Wallington. For services to homeless people.
- Scott John Watkin, Eye Care and Vision Development Officer, SeeAbility. For services to people with learning disabilities.
- Paul Watson, Vice Chairman, Lee-on-Solent Branch, Royal Naval Association. For voluntary service to veterans.
- Janine Webber. For services to Holocaust education.
- Philippa Pia Webster, Trustee, NSPCC. For services to children and young people.
- Shirley Ann Wells. For services to education and young people.
- Kerstin Yvonne Wheeler, Higher Officer, Border Force Intelligence, Home Office. For services to preventing modern slavery and protecting vulnerable people.
- Susan Jacqueline Whitham, Head of Student Services, St Mary's University, Twickenham. For services to higher education.
- Ellen Wiles, Chef, Oak Field Special School. For services to children with special dietary requirements.
- Alyson Elizabeth Williams. For services to young people and the community in Swansea.
- David John Williams, First Aid Volunteer and Trainer, Shrewsbury Branch, British Red Cross. For voluntary service to first aid.
- Doris Williams. For services to choral singing in the North East.
- Geoffrey David Williams. For services to the community in Merseyside.
- David Alan Wilson, Conductor, Slough Philharmonic Orchestra and Chorus. For services to music and young people.
- John Samuel Wilson. For services to the community in Newtownstewart, County Tyrone.
- Freda Wineman. For services to Holocaust education.
- Alan Robert Witham, Parish Councillor. For services to the community in Erpingham, Norfolk.
- Michael John Woodhall. For services to the community in Hampshire.
- David Thomas William Woodward. For services to youth hockey in South Yorkshire.
- Frances Elizabeth Woolaway. For services to the Ways and Means Trust and the community in Caversham, Berkshire.
- Gillian Doreen Worthing, Manager, Holy Trinity Cadet Unit, Hereford, St John Ambulance. For services to first aid and young people.
- Brian Arthur Frederick Yeoman. For services to lions clubs international and the community in Bramley and Wickersley, South Yorkshire.

Diplomatic Service and Overseas List

- Monica Allen, Volunteer. For services to the community in the British Virgin Islands.
- Ian Alexander Baddon, Volunteer for cancer patients, Cyprus. For services to supporting patients with both cancer and dementia.
- Peter George Davies, Third Secretary, Foreign and Commonwealth Office. For services to British foreign policy.
- Leo Gabriel Paul Marie Joseph Demay, Director of International Affairs, United Nations Military Cemetery in Korea. For services to British and Commonwealth Korea War veterans.
- Gillian Hanlon, Third Secretary, Foreign and Commonwealth Office. For services to British foreign policy.
- John Allan Hunter, lately Chair of the Argentine-British Community Council. For services to the Anglo-Argentine community in Argentina.
- Peter Ibbetson, Third Secretary, Foreign and Commonwealth Office. For services to British foreign policy.
- Sonia Penelope Stanton, Service Children's Education Teacher, Ralston School, Alberta. For services to service children's education in Canada.
- Martin Gideon Walsh, Head of Corporate Services, British Embassy Budapest. For services to British interests in Hungary.
- Sabra Williams, Director, the Prison Project and director of engagement, the Actors Group, Los Angeles. For services to the arts and prison reform.

=== Royal Red Cross ===
==== Members of the Royal Red Cross, First Class (RRC) ====
Military Division

Army

- Lieutenant Colonel Simon Davies, Queen Alexandra's Royal Army Nursing Corps, Army Reserve

=== Queen's Police Medal (QPM) ===
Ribbon bar of the Queen's Police Medal for Merit, as awarded for Distinguished Service

Queen's Police Medal For Distinguished Service

England and Wales

- Detective Constable Alice Barr, Surrey Police
- Detective Chief Inspector Michael Vincent Callan, Durham Constabulary
- Jeremy Graham, Chief Constable, Cumbria Constabulary
- Charles Edwin Nelson Hall, Chief Constable, Hertfordshire Constabulary
- Constable Matthew Hone, City of London Police
- Matthew Jonathan Jukes, Deputy Chief Constable, South Wales Police
- Constable Virginia Jupp, Sussex Police
- Constable Paul Lockhart, Metropolitan Police Service
- Andrew David Marsh, Chief Constable, Avon and Somerset Constabulary
- Constable Tina Louise Newman, Avon and Somerset Constabulary
- Constable Adele Owen, Greater Manchester Police
- Superintendent Lee Porter, South Wales Police
- Inspector William James Scott, North Yorkshire Police
- Michelle Skeer, Deputy Chief Constable, Cumbria Constabulary
- Neill Tully, lately Constable, Metropolitan Police Service
- Constable Sara Widdrington, North Yorkshire Police
- Chief Superintendent Richard Wood, Metropolitan Police Service
- Superintendent Matthew Wratten, British Transport Police

Scotland

- Superintendent Lesley Clark, Police Service of Scotland
- Chief Superintendent Barry McEwan, Police Service of Scotland

Northern Ireland

- Superintendent Alywin John Barton, Police Service of Northern Ireland
- Detective Inspector Jeremy Thomas McFarland, Police Service of Northern Ireland

=== Queen's Fire Service Medal (QFSM) ===
Ribbon bar of the Queen's Fire Service Medal for Merit, as awarded for Distinguished Service

Queen's Fire Service Medal For Distinguished Service

England and Wales

- Chief Fire Officer James William Courtney, South Yorkshire Fire and Rescue Service
- Chief Fire Officer Philip John Loach, West Midlands Fire Service
- Chief Fire Officer Russell Pearson, Surrey Fire and Rescue Service
- Watch Manager Karen Anne Soady, Tyne and Wear Fire and Rescue Service
- Chief Fire Officer Paul Walker, Cornwall Fire and Rescue Service

Scotland

- Fire-Fighter Gordon Brown, Scottish Fire and Rescue Service

=== Queen's Ambulance Service Medal (QAM) ===
Ribbon bar of the Queen's Ambulance Service Medal for Merit, as awarded for Distinguished Service

Queen's Ambulance Service Medal For Distinguished Service

England and Wales

- Kuldip Singh Bhamrah, Technician, East Midlands Ambulance Service NHS Trust
- Kath Charters, Clinical data specialist, Welsh Ambulance Service NHS Trust
- David Roger Thomas John, advanced paramedic practitioner, Welsh Ambulance Service NHS Trust
- Diane Jessica Scott, Deputy chief executive officer, West Midlands Ambulance Service NHS Foundation Trust

Scotland

- Mark Treherne, SORT Team Leader, East of Scotland Special Operations Response Team, Scottish Ambulance Service

=== Queen's Volunteer Reserves Medal (QVRM) ===
Ribbon bar of the Queen's Volunteer Reserves Medal

Royal Navy

- Corporal Timothy Byrom, Royal Marines Reserve

Army

- Warrant Officer Class 2 Peter Lewis Gliwitzki, the Mercian Regiment, Army Reserve
- Warrant Officer Class 1 Nigel Christian Marshall, Corps of Royal Engineers, Army Reserve
- Sergeant Alan Rainey, the Royal Logistic Corps, Army Reserve
- Warrant Officer Class 2 Steven Singleton, the Parachute Regiment, Army Reserve

Royal Air Force

- Warrant Officer Shobha Earl, Royal Auxiliary Air Force
- Flight Lieutenant Norman McKay Gray, Royal Auxiliary Air Force

=== Overseas Territories Police Medal (OTPM) ===
Ribbon bar of the Overseas Territories Police Medal for Merit, as awarded for Meritorious Service

Diplomatic Service and Overseas List

- Superintendent Andreas Pitsillides, Sovereign Base Areas Police, Cyprus

== Crown Dependencies ==
=== The Most Excellent Order of the British Empire ===
==== Officer of the Order of the British Empire (OBE) ====
Jersey

- Philip Sidney Gower. For services to vulnerable children and young people in Jersey.

==== Member of the Order of the British Empire (MBE) ====
Isle of Man

- Norma Angela Aire. For services to Breast Cancer Now Isle of Man and the wider community.
- Aileen Norma Gelling. For services to the Isle of Man Prison's Independent Monitoring Board.

Guernsey

- Derek Alfred Webb. For services to table tennis in Guernsey.

=== British Empire Medal (BEM) ===
Isle of Man

- Julian Roderick Power. For services to the Manx community.

Guernsey

- Anne Mildred Diamond. For services to the deaf community in Guernsey.

Jersey

- Stuart William Elliott. For services to the community in Jersey.

== Antigua and Barbuda ==
Below are the individuals appointed by Elizabeth II in her right as Queen of Antigua and Barbuda, on advice of Her Majesty's Ministers in Antigua and Barbuda.

=== The Most Excellent Order of the British Empire ===
==== Officer of the Order of the British Empire (OBE) ====
- Dr. Barbara Jean Paca. For services to heritage development.

==== Member of the Order of the British Empire (MBE) ====
- Stephen Joseph. For services to business and community development.

=== Queen's Police Medal (QPM) ===
- Albert Michael Patrick Wade, Assistant Police Commissioner. For services to national security and public safety.

== The Bahamas ==
Below are the individuals appointed by Elizabeth II in her right as Queen of The Bahamas, on advice of Her Majesty's Ministers in the Bahamas.

=== The Most Distinguished Order of Saint Michael and Saint George ===
==== Companion of the Order of St Michael and St George (CMG) ====
- Lawrence Cartwright. For services to education and politics.
- Mark Holowesko. For services to business and to the community.
- Reverend Dr. Ranford Patterson. For services to religion, education and to the community.

=== The Most Excellent Order of the British Empire ===
==== Officer of the Order of the British Empire (OBE) ====
- Pastor Rex Major. For services to religion and to the community.
- Antonius Roberts. For services to education, the arts and to the community.
- Dr. Robin Roberts. For services to medicine.
- David Thompson. For services to the legal community and politics.

==== Member of the Order of the British Empire (MBE) ====
- Elma Garraway. For services to education and to the community.
- Nancy Kelly. For services to education and volunteering.
- Dr. Nigel Lewis. For services to dentistry, the community and politics.
- Dr. Jonathan Rodgers. For services to ophthalmology.

=== British Empire Medal (BEM) ===
- Roney Armbrister. For services to entertainment and the community.
- Willis Bain. For services to the arts and to the community.
- Lewellyn Augustine Cartwright. For services to business.
- Kendal Romeo Haurtwerth Culmer For services to business and politics.
- Elijah Miller. For services to politics and to the community.
- Quintin Woodside. For services to business and to the community.

=== Queen's Police Medal (QPM) ===
Queen's Police Medal For Distinguished Service

- Anthony Ferguson, Commissioner of Police. For services to policing and the community.
- James Vaughan, Chief Constable of Dorset Police.

== Barbados ==
Below are the individuals appointed by Elizabeth II in her right as Queen of Barbados, on advice of Her Majesty's Barbados Ministers.

=== The Most Excellent Order of the British Empire ===
==== Commander of the Order of the British Empire (CBE) ====
- Shirley Farnum. For service to public service.
- Reverend Dr. Orlando Seale. For services to religious education.
- Charles Smith. For public service.

==== Officer of the Order of the British Empire (OBE) ====
- Linda Brooks. For services to the labour movement.
- Carlton Hinds. For services to the catering industry.
- Cedric Murrell. For services to the labour movement.

==== Member of the Order of the British Empire (MBE) ====
- Velmo Cadogan. For services to the Barbados Fire Service.
- Alvin Carter. For services to education.
- Clifford Clarke. For services to the Barbados Fire Service.

== Belize ==
Below are the individuals appointed by Elizabeth II in her right as Queen of Belize, on advice of Her Majesty's Belize Ministers.

=== The Most Excellent Order of the British Empire ===
==== Commander of the Order of the British Empire (CBE) ====
- Douglas Anthony Singh. For services to commerce, industry and community leadership.

==== Officer of the Order of the British Empire (OBE) ====
- Dinesh Bhojwani. For services to commerce, industry and community leadership.
- John Longsworth. For public service.

==== Member of the Order of the British Empire (MBE) ====
- Armando Chang. For services to business and to the community.
- Manuel Cowo. For services to the community and religion.
- Jeaneane Vaneasa Neal. For services to education and to the community.
- Joel Westby. For services to education and to the community.
- Marilyn Williams RN For public service and to the legal fraternity.

== Grenada ==
Below are the individuals appointed by Elizabeth II in her right as Queen of Grenada, on advice of Her Majesty's Grenada Ministers.

=== The Most Excellent Order of the British Empire ===
==== Commander of the Order of the British Empire (CBE) ====
- Sister Maureen Alexander. For services to education.

==== Officer of the Order of the British Empire (OBE) ====
- Andre Cherman. For services to business.

==== Member of the Order of the British Empire (MBE) ====
- Cecil St Louis. For services to education.

=== British Empire Medal (BEM) ===
- Adrian Blackman. For services to the community.
- Sergeant Lawrence Francis. For services to the community.

== Saint Christopher and Nevis ==
Below are the individuals appointed by Elizabeth II in her right as Queen of Saint Kitts and Nevis, on advice of Her Majesty's Saint Christopher and Nevis Ministers.

=== The Most Excellent Order of the British Empire ===
==== Officer of the Order of the British Empire (OBE) ====
- Patricia Anelta Hobson. For services to education and public service.

==== Member of the Order of the British Empire (MBE) ====
- Benjamin Cromwell Francis. For services to business.
- Dr. Ian Jacobs. For services to the medical profession.

=== Queen's Police Medal (QPM) ===
Queen's Police Medal For Distinguished Service

- Inspector Alphonso Leroy Hendrickson. For services to police service.

== Solomon Islands ==
Below are the individuals appointed by Elizabeth II in her right as Queen of the Solomon Islands, on advice of Her Majesty's Solomon Island Ministers.

=== The Most Excellent Order of the British Empire ===
==== Officer of the Order of the British Empire (OBE) ====
- Kaába Newton Maági. For services to education, the Church and rural development.

==== Member of the Order of the British Empire (MBE) ====
- Violine Evalita Titiulu Aruafu. For services to nursing and to the community.
- Chief Patteson Kikolo. For services to rural and community development.
- Chief Johnson Leamana. For services to rural and community development.
- Taeasi Sanga. For public service and community development.

=== British Empire Medal (BEM) ===
- Israel Ratu Adino. For services to rural and community development.
- Cecil Beliga. For services to community development.
- John Vine Golomo. For services to community development.
- Jerry Jackson Suku. For services to community development.
