= Angela Pedder =

Angela Mary Pedder
- Born: 1958 (age 67–68)
- Occupations: Health care administrator; NHS manager

Dame Angela Mary Pedder DBE is a British health care administrator and NHS manager.

Pedder started her career in the NHS as a management trainee in 1975. In 1987 she was appointed Unit General Manager of Community Services in North Hertfordshire and in 1991 Chief Executive of St Alban's & Hemel Hempstead NHS Trust.

She was Chief Executive of Royal Devon and Exeter NHS Foundation Trust for 19 years and the leader of the Devon Sustainability and transformation plan until 2017. In 2014/15 she earned between £180,000 and £185,000.

In 2014, she used Twitter to criticise her trust when it sent a letter to a patient of whose death it had been notified who did not attend an appointment, and was criticised by the Patients Association.

Pedder was created a Dame Commander of the Order of the British Empire in the 2018 New Year Honours. She is chair of the trustees of Exmouth Deaf Academy.
