= Susan Kruse =

American-Scottish community archaeologist

Susan Elizabeth Kruse MBE
- Born: USA
- Occupation: Archaeologist

Academic background
- Education: University College London
- Thesis: Viking age silver ingots from England and Wales and their economic implications (1988)

Academic work
- Discipline: Archaeology
- Sub-discipline: Viking archaeology Community archaeology
- Institutions: Workers’ Educational Association; Archaeology for Communities of the Highlands

Susan Elizabeth Kruse MBE (born c.1955) is an American-Scottish archaeologist specialising in Viking material culture and Community Archaeology.

== Biography ==
Kruse undertook her undergraduate degree in Anthropology and Archaeology at Cornell University. She first came to the UK in 1977 to undertake postgraduate study with the University of Durham. Her 1980 Masters thesis was titled "Danish connections 1000 - 1066: an archaeological perspective". She completed her PhD at University College London in 1988 with a thesis titled "Viking age silver ingots from England and Wales and their economic implications".

She moved to the Highlands in 1996 and became a tutor for the Workers’ Educational Association. Through the WEA she has taught courses on various subjects, including archaeology and women's suffrage in Scotland.

In January 2009 she co-founded Archaeology for Communities of the Highlands (ARCH), a community archaeology charity.

Kruse was awarded an MBE in the 2018 New Year Honours for services to community archaeology in the Highlands of Scotland.

== Select publications ==
- Kruse, Susan E. 1988. "Ingots and weight units in Viking Age silver hoards." World Archaeology 20.2: 285-301.
- Kruse, Susan E. 1992. "Late Saxon balances and weights from England." Medieval Archaeology 36.1: 67-95.
- Kruse, Susan, and James Tate. 1992. "XRF analysis of Viking Age silver ingots." Proceedings of the Society of Antiquaries of Scotland. Vol. 122.
- Kruse, Susan E. 2016. "Trade and exchange across frontiers." Silver economy in the Viking Age. Routledge: 179-192.
