= Deborah Brownson =

British autism campaigner

Deborah Louise Brownson MBE (born October 1974) is a solicitor and British autism campaigner. She campaigned successfully for autism to be included in teacher training and wrote a leading guide to the condition, He's Not Naughty!, told from the point of view of a child. She was awarded an MBE in March 2018 by Prince William, the Duke of Cornwall and Cambridge, for her outstanding contribution to global autism awareness.

Brownson's eldest son was diagnosed as severely autistic at 18 months. Frustrated with how his primary school was treating him she removed him at age 5 and homeschooled him for five months. She stopped working as a solicitor to focus on her role as caretaker. The notes she collected while caring for her son became, He's Not Naughty! A Children's Guide to Autism.

== Selected publications ==
- He's Not Naughty! A Children's Guide to Autism, Bodhi Book Press Ltd (2014) ISBN 978-1-78592-872-7
- Life will never be dull: The little book of autism adventures, Jessica Kingsley Publishers (2020) ISBN 978-1-78775-322-8
- Rebel Legs! - A Humorous Guide to Cerebral Palsy, by Frankie Warburton-Watts and Deborah Brownson (2018)
