= James R. Verrier =

American businessman

James R. Verrier (born 1963) was the chief executive officer at automotive industry component supplier BorgWarner from 2013-2018. In 2017 the company estimated his pay package to be worth about $10 million.

== Education ==
Verrier has a degree in metallurgy and materials science from West Midlands College in the United Kingdom and an MBA from the University of Glamorgan.

== Career ==
Verrier has worked at BorgWarner since the 1990s. He has been the company's president, chief operating officer, vice president and was president and general manager of BorgWarner Morse TEC Inc., and VP and GM of passenger car at BorgWarner Turbo Systems Inc. He also worked in the fields of human resources, operations management and quality control since joining the firm in 1989. Prior to joining BorgWarner he worked in the quality engineering and metallurgy field with Lucas Aerospace, Rockwell Automotive and Britax Wingard in the United Kingdom.

Verrier has been chief executive officer and a member of the board of directors at BorgWarner Inc. since the beginning of 2013. He took over from Tim Manganello, who had held the position of CEO for the previous decade.

Verrier is also a trustee of Manufacturers Alliance for Productivity and Innovation, Inc. and a member of the Business Roundtable. His total compensation for 2013 was $8,127,638.
