= Lucia Mee =

Organ donation campaigner (1999–2020)

Lucia Mee

Lucia Quinney Mee BEM (28 May 1999 – 24 May 2020) was a Northern Irish campaigner for organ donation, having had four liver transplants herself, the first at the age of eight. She took part in the 2016 Transplant Games. She started the Live Loudly Donate Proudly campaign.
