= Padrós =

Padrós or Padros is a Spanish surname. Notable people with the surname include:

- Carlos Padrós (1870–1950), Spanish politician, businessman, and football pioneer
- David Padrós (1942–2016), Catalan composer
- Jaume Padrós i Selma (born 1959), Catalan physician and politician
- Juan Padrós (1869–1932), Spanish businessman and sports leader
- José Padrós (born 1947), Spanish water polo player
- Xavier Marcos Padros, Spanish Formula One engineer
