= Bozzi =

Bozzi is an Italian surname.

Notable people with this surname include:

- Aldo Bozzi (1909–1987), Italian lawyer and politician
- Bryan Bozzi (born 1989), Italian-Danish race engineer
- Emilio Bozzi (1873–1936), Italian businessman
- Giovanni Bozzi (born 1963), Belgian basketball coach
- Giuseppe Maria Bozzi (1772–1833), Italian priest
- Julie Bozzi, American artist
- León Bozzi (1928–1987), Argentinian former sports shooter
- Marie-Jeanne Bozzi (1955–2011), French politician and criminal
- Mike Bozzi, American engineer
- Paolo Bozzi (1930–2003), Italian psychologist

== See also ==
- Libreria Bozzi, Genoa, oldest bookshop in Italy
