= 40 Squadron SAAF =

40 Squadron
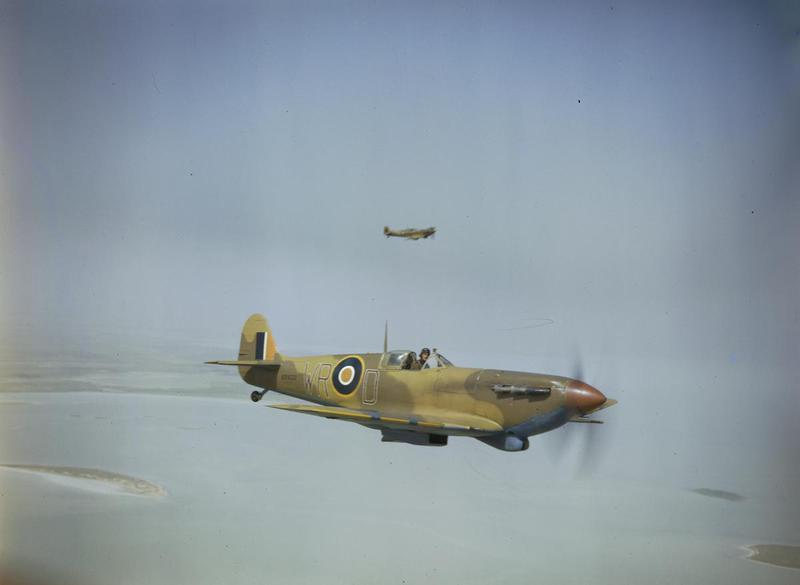
- Spitfire VB Trop of 40 Squadron SAAF fitted with the "streamlined" version of the Aboukir filter, a Rotol propeller and clipped wings
- Country: (South Africa)
- Branch: South African Air Force
- Role: Reconnaissance Squadron: World War II; Training Squadron: Post World War II
- Motto: Exercitui Oculus Eyes of the Army

Commanders
- Notable commanders: Lt. Genl Robert 'Bob' Rogers

Insignia
- Squadron Identification Code: WR (1939-1945)
- Insignia

40 Squadron SAAF existed as a combat unit from early 1940 through to late 1945. It served in the East African Campaign, Western Desert, Tunisia, and Italy, reaching Austria by the end of World War II. The squadron's motto in those years was Amethlo e Impi – "the eyes of the army".

== History ==
=== East Africa ===
40 Squadron was formed in May 1940 at Waterkloof Air Station, under the command of Major (later Major-General) Jimmy Durrant, as part of the South African Air Force's expansion early in World War II. It was an Army Co-Operation squadron equipped with Hartebeest aircraft (a South African variant of the Hawker Hart). The squadron deployed to Kenya in August 1940, and in September started operations in Italian East Africa supporting the South African 1st Division. This effort continued throughout the East African Campaign. Operations included Tactical reconnaissance, Armed Recce and Photo Recce using handheld cameras.

In April 1941 it was decided that the squadron be converted to a bomber squadron and equipped with Martin Marylands. Although this conversion never took place, the squadron was disbanded at Neghelli in Ethiopia at the end of May 1941 and its sixteen Hawker Hartebeest aircraft were handed over to 41 Squadron at Yavello on 2 June 1941.

=== North Africa ===
In September 1941, after a brief period back in South Africa, the squadron's personnel were flown to Egypt to join the Desert Air Force. Until new aircraft arrived, the squadron operated at Burg-el-Arab as an Advanced Maintenance Unit. In this period, six pilots were attached to 208 Squadron RAF for operational experience in modern monoplane fighters. The squadron became fully operational in March 1942, flying the Hawker Hurricane Mk.I adapted for desert conditions. It flew Tac.Rs and Photo Recce in support of XIII Corps, British Eighth Army.

The squadron's pilots soon learnt to operate in pairs and to stay out of range of small arms fire from the ground, to reduce casualties; however, as Erwin Rommel's Afrika Korps prepared to go on the offensive, Luftwaffe Messerschmitt Bf 109 fighters concentrated on intercepting Tac.R aircraft. Casualties rose rapidly until HQ Desert Air Force ordered a fighter escort for all Tac.Rs. This reduced the rate of losses; and it continued until the Axis breakthrough at the battle of Bir Hakeim in June 1942, when fighter squadrons were given other priorities.

The squadron's advance landing ground at El Adem was attacked by German tanks at dusk on the first day of their offensive. The squadron fell back on Sidi Aziz, from there to Tobruk, and then to El Alamein. The rapid retreat played havoc with communications and supplies, which drastically curtailed the squadron's operational effectiveness.

In July 1942 the squadron was operating once again from Burg-el-Arab during the First Battle of El Alamein, as the German offensive slowed and stopped; the crisis having passed, it moved out of the line for rest and re-equipment. The squadron converted to the Hurricane Mk.II and in late October it moved up to Burg-el-Adem in preparation for the Second Battle of El Alamein, supporting X Corps (the unit formed to break out). Following its victory the Eighth Army advanced rapidly, and the squadron scrambled to keep up. The advance Flight moved base 12 times in one month, and the main squadron base 6 times.

At the end of November 1942 the squadron was attached to XXX Corps. Enemy fighter activity had been limited while the Germans were in full retreat, but stabilisation of the line changed that; most Tac.Rs were intercepted, and the casualty rate rose steeply. Once again, fighter cover was ordered by HQ, from 6 to 12 aircraft depending on the Tac.R target area.

Early in January 1943 the Army requested long range Tac.Rs behind enemy landing grounds, flown with Curtiss Kittyhawk escorts; but high losses amongst Tac.R and escort aircraft meant that these were soon discontinued. As Eighth Army advanced through Libya into Tunisia, the squadron continued to fly Tac.R and Photo Recce sorties in support. The squadron converted to the Supermarine Spitfire Vb at the end of February 1943. This variant had clipped wingtips to enhance its low-altitude performance, most notably its roll-speed. Sorties now included vertical and oblique photography, battle area Tac.R, target marking for fighter bombers, searches for night bomber targets, and identification of landmarks for day bomber navigation. In early 1943 the squadron received Artillery R training, however, unreliable radios meant that arty/R shoots were not as successful as had been hoped. Nevertheless, the squadron continued to report the activities of enemy artillery.

=== Sicily ===
At the end of June 1943 two Flights deployed to Inqa airfield on Malta, as part of the operations preparing for the invasion of Sicily, Operation Husky. Oblique photographs were taken of the invasion area and intensive Tac.R operations started on the day prior to the invasion. A few days after the beachhead had been established, the squadron moved to a Sicilian landing-ground and continued with its usual workload in support of XIII Corps. It also added Naval Arty.R shoots to its repertoire, assisting HMS Roberts in bombarding roads inland.

A letter to the squadron's CO from GOC XIII Corps, Lieutenant-General Miles Dempsey, illustrates the squadron's efficiency in this period:

“I am writing this note to you to thank you very much for the oblique photographs which you have taken for me during the last 3 or 4 days. They are quite first class and are exactly what we wanted. I would be grateful if you would tell the pilots concerned how important these photos are to us and how much we appreciate their work. I would also like to take this opportunity to thank you and the whole of 40 Squadron for the fine work you did for XIII Corps during the operations in Sicily.”

The following message was also received from HQ Special Services Brigade Detachment:

“I am writing to thank you personally for the most excellent oblique photographs you took on August 6. These photographs were required, as I expect you know, for a project which, to our intense regret, the powers that be cancelled. Although the sortie was therefore in vain, I can assure you that it would not have been possible to carry out the operation without the information obtained from the photographs, which incidentally are the best I have ever seen.”

=== Italy ===
After the Siciilan campaign ended on 18 August 1943, the squadron started on long range recce of the toe of Italy and low level oblique photography of the Italian coast. Some Naval Arty.Rs were also carried out on gun positions in the toe of Italy, including shoots with the battleships HMS Rodney and HMS Nelson.

The squadron ceased operations early in September and withdrew to North Africa to re-equip with the Spitfire IX in its clipped-wing form. Even before the move was completed, one Flight recommenced operations under the operational control of 329 Wing RAF, for whom numerous Pathfinder Tac.Rs were flown. During this period the squadron's bag of enemy MT, guns and equipment was considerable.

For the rest of 1943, the squadron was fragmented: the Flight in Italy operated from a succession of landing-grounds near the Adriatic coast, while the main part of the squadron remained in North Africa. Only in mid-January 1944 were the two reunited: but not for long.

On 26 February 'A' Flight was detached to operate in conjunction with No. 225 Squadron RAF in support of US Fifth Army. Operations covered the Cassino -Rome road, Rome itself, and the Anzio beachhead. In April the whole squadron, reunited once again, was operating in support of Fifth Army.

The squadron continued to move with the Army, five times in June and twice in July. Missions were Tac.Rs and Photo.Rs. A detachment sent to Corsica flew Naval Arty.R shoots as part of the invasion of Elba. During July, Fleet Air Arm pilots were attached to the squadron for training as Fighter Reconnaissance pilots, in preparation for the invasion of the South of France.

On 25 August the squadron resumed its support of 8th Army's assault on the Gothic Line. It suffered especially heavy casualties during the Battle of Gemmano and in the Rimini area. It then operated from a series of landing grounds on the Adriatic, including one actually on the beach. In Autumn 1944, the squadron settled at the former Regia Aeronautica base at Forli, enjoying concrete runways and all the amenities of an established station.

=== Greece ===
On 9 December 1944 four pilots (WS/Lieut. H. Davison, WS/Lieut. R. T. Joyner, WS/Lieut.N. K. Macallun, T/Lieut. A. C. de Villiers) flying Spitfire VBs borrowed from 318 (Polish) Squadron were detached to the Balkan Air Force. There they were to operate in Greece against ELAS, as part of the Western Allies' intervention in the Greek Civil War. Aircraft from several other Desert Air Force units also tried to cross the Adriatic to Greece on that day: all the aircraft and their crews were lost, apart from the 40 Squadron pilots.

A strong north-easterly wind and dark clouds blew the aircraft off course and forced them ever lower. The radio beacon at Patras, on which all the aircraft were homing, was not turned on. The four squadron pilots had agreed that if one had to ditch for lack of fuel, they all should: and just as the first had reported that his tanks were showing empty, another saw an island in the murk. Without delay, all four made wheels-up landings in a field on what turned out to be Zakynthos. Some of the inhabitants were openly hostile, but a local land-owner rescued the pilots and put them on a fishing-boat for the mainland.

The detachment was based on Kalamaki Airfield near Athens, this time flying Spitfire VBs which had previously been used by a Greek squadron. Over the next month it made 93 sorties without loss; these included long range Tac.Rs, Target Search Arty.Rs and Arty.Rs, as well as pathfinder missions for Beaufighters and Spitfires. After dark the pilots joined in the defence of the airfield perimeter against ELAS attacks, Sten guns in hand.

The BAF detachment rejoined the squadron on 13 January 1945, followed by a signal from AOC, Air HQ Greece:

"I should like to thank you for the loan of the four pilots of 40 SAAF Squadron who have now been returned.

"Please convey to the Squadron Commander my appreciation of their work. They met every call made on them and gave very valuable and accurate information to me at all times. Their enthusiasm and ability were quite exceptional."

=== Post War ===
In 1953 40 Squadron was re-established at Rand Airport, Germiston as an Active Citizen Force Squadron flying Harvards. It was moved to Central Flying School Dunnottar in 1965. In August 1982 the squadron was re-equipped with Aermacchi MB-326 Impala aircraft and returned to their original base, AFB Waterkloof. The squadron was finally disbanded on 29 April 1985.

== Aircraft ==
Aircraft flown by 40 Squadron
Note: Aircraft type photographs may not necessarily represent aircraft of the same mark or actual aircraft belonging to the squadron.
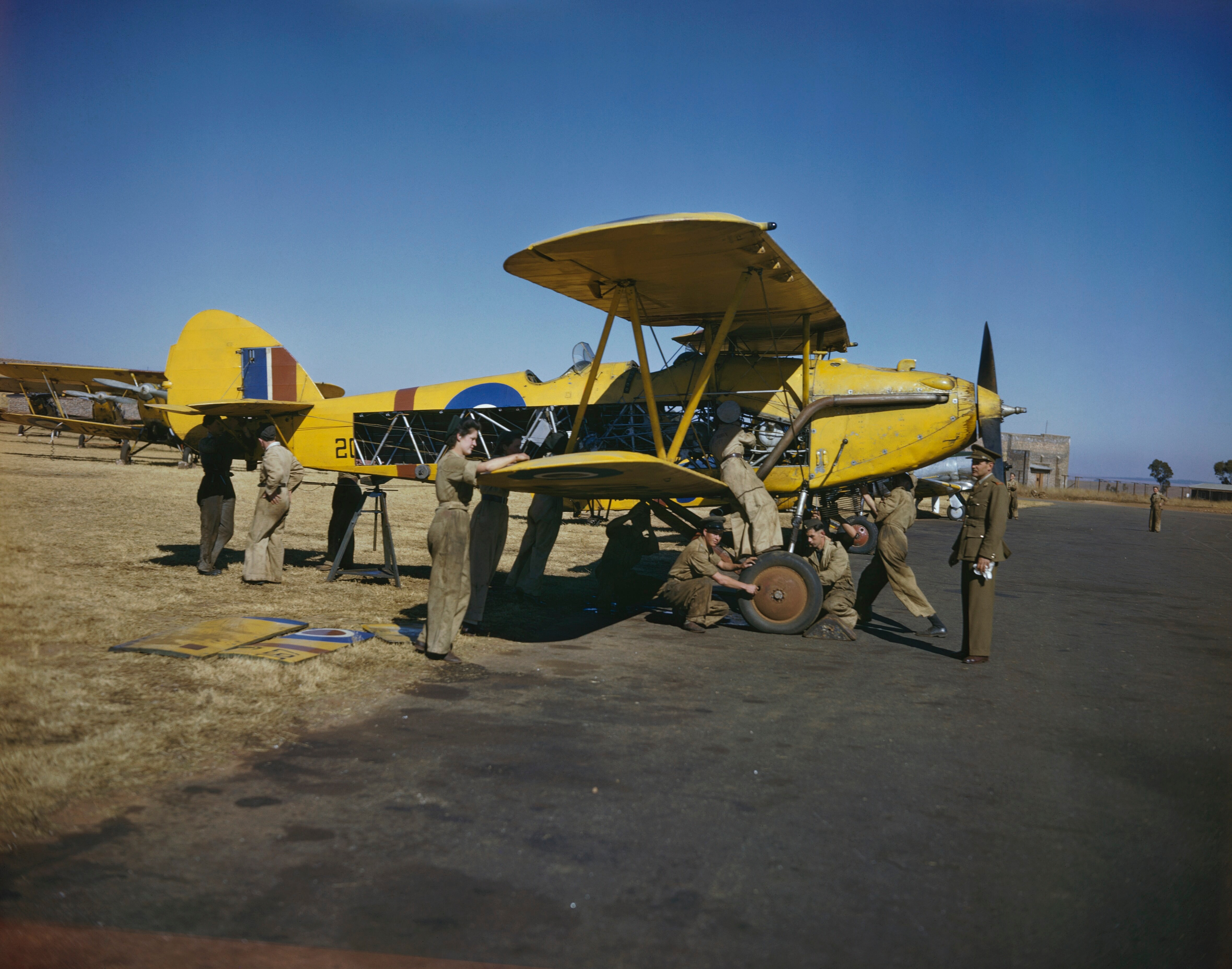
Hartbees
1940-1941

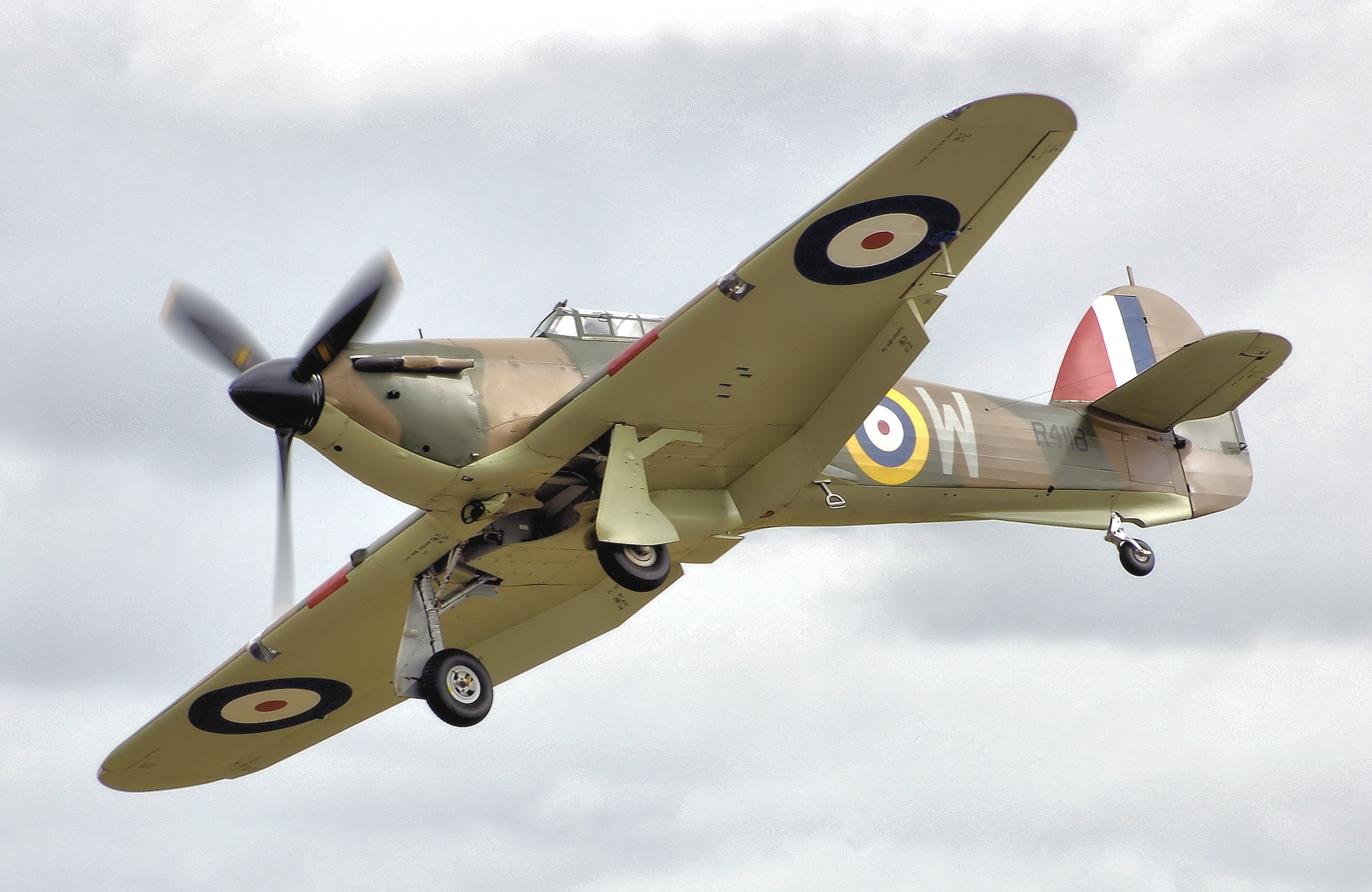
Hurricane Mk.I
1941-1942

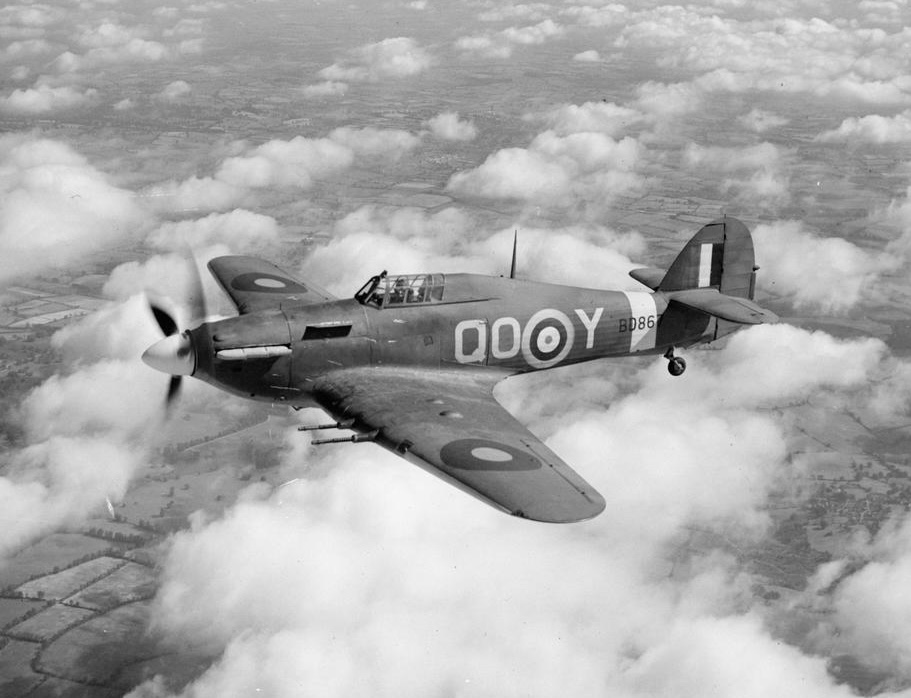
Hurricane Mk.II
1942-1943

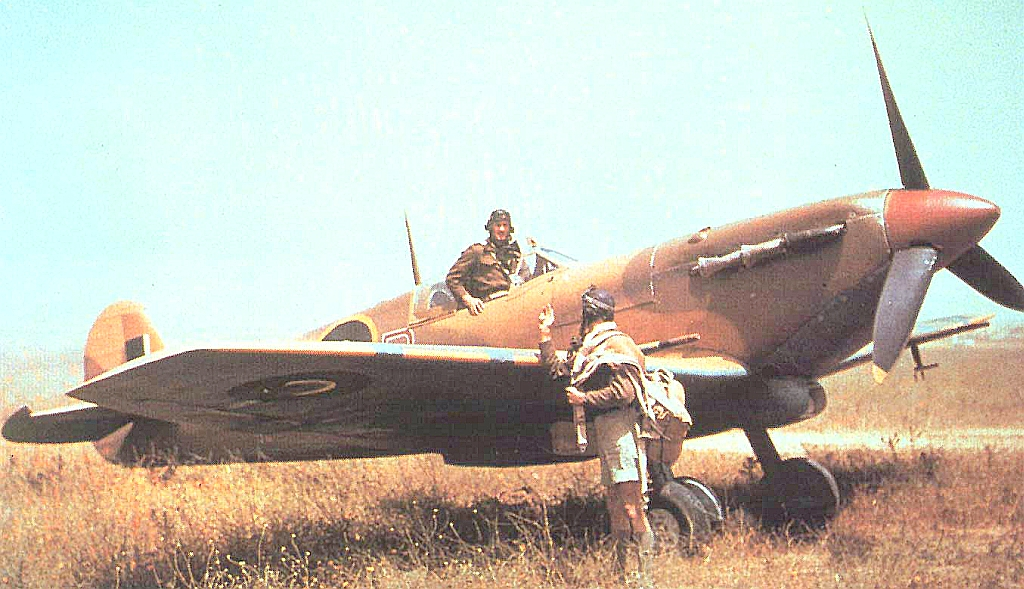
Spitfire Mk.VB
1943-1945

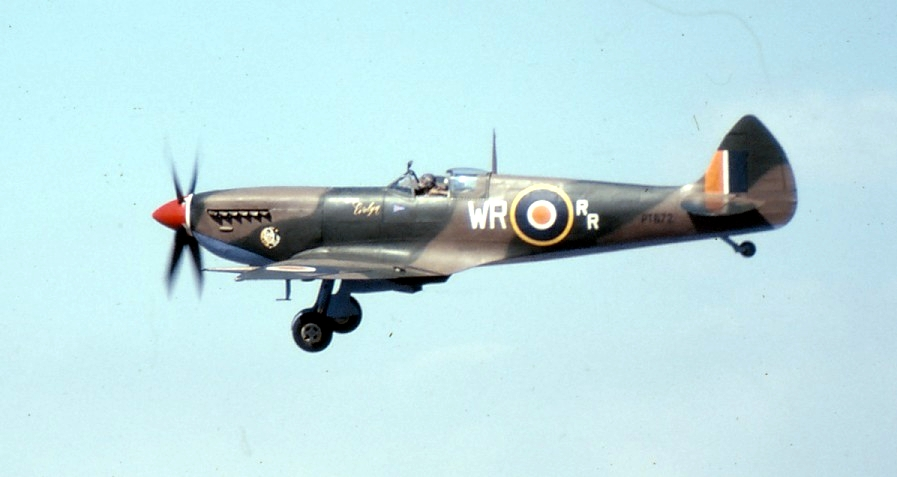
Spitfire Mk.IX
1943-1945

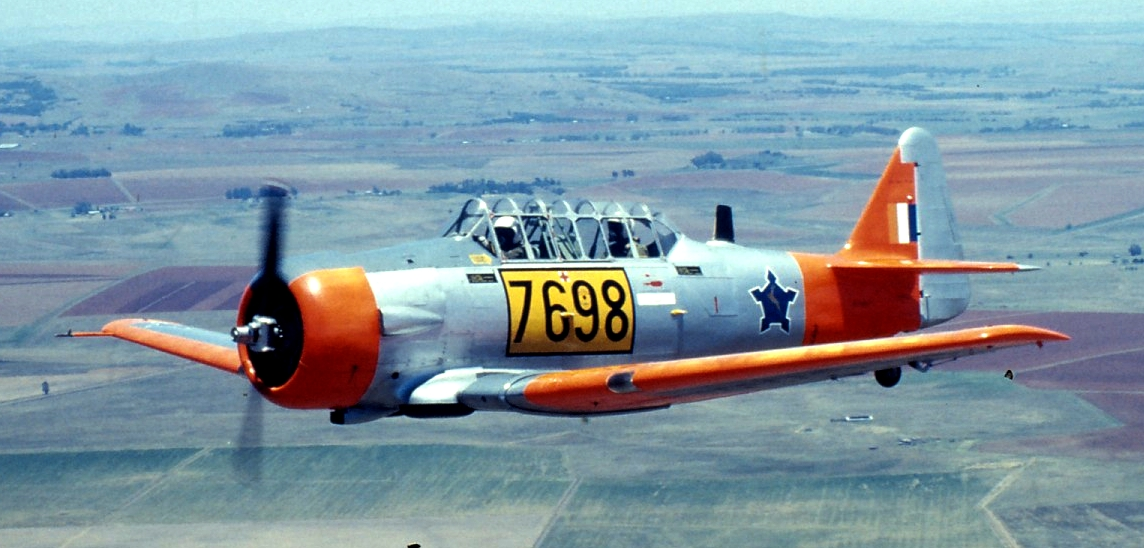
Harvard T6G
1953-1982

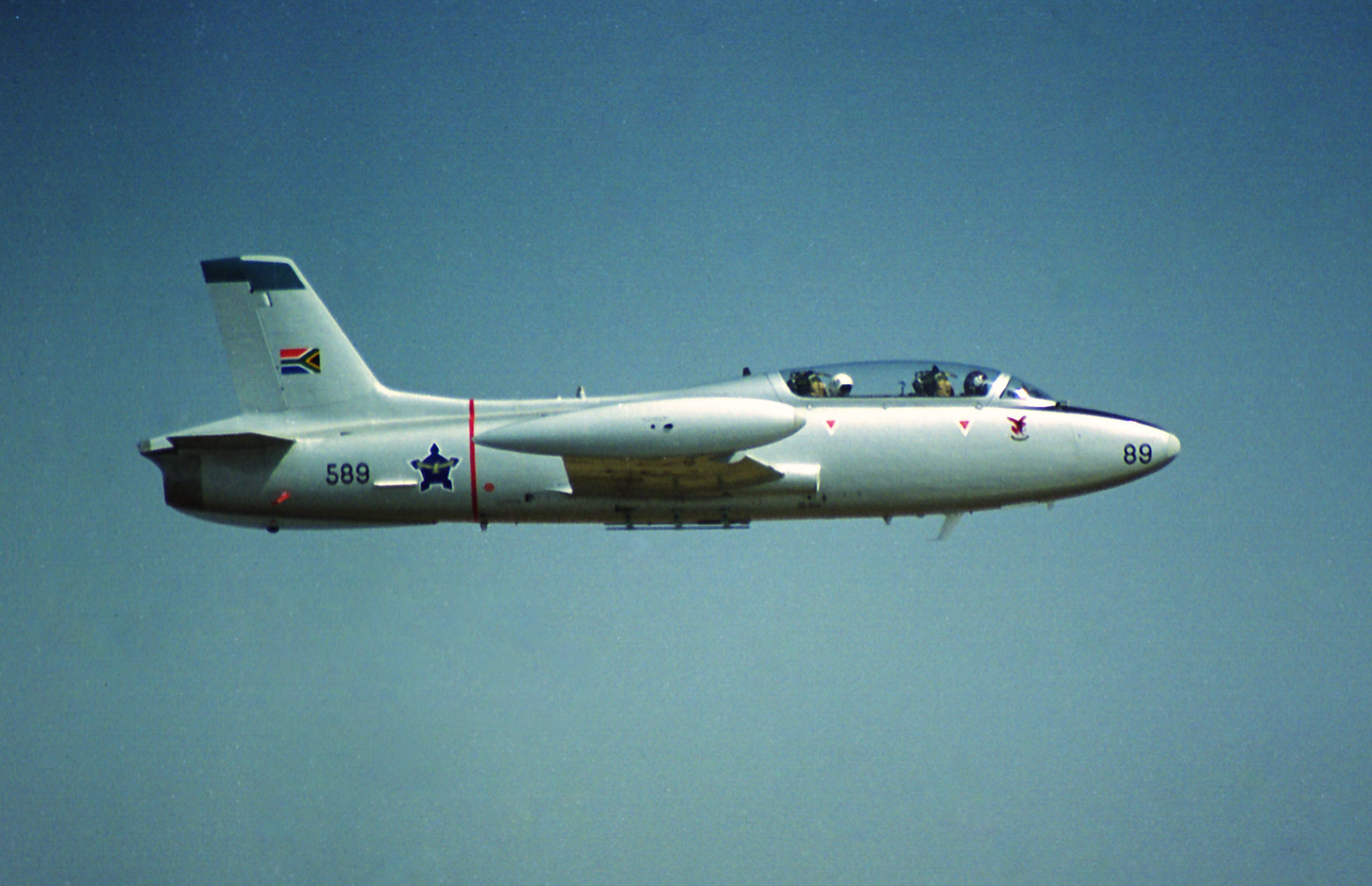
Impala Mk.I
1982-1985
