= Palazzo Spinola Gambaro =

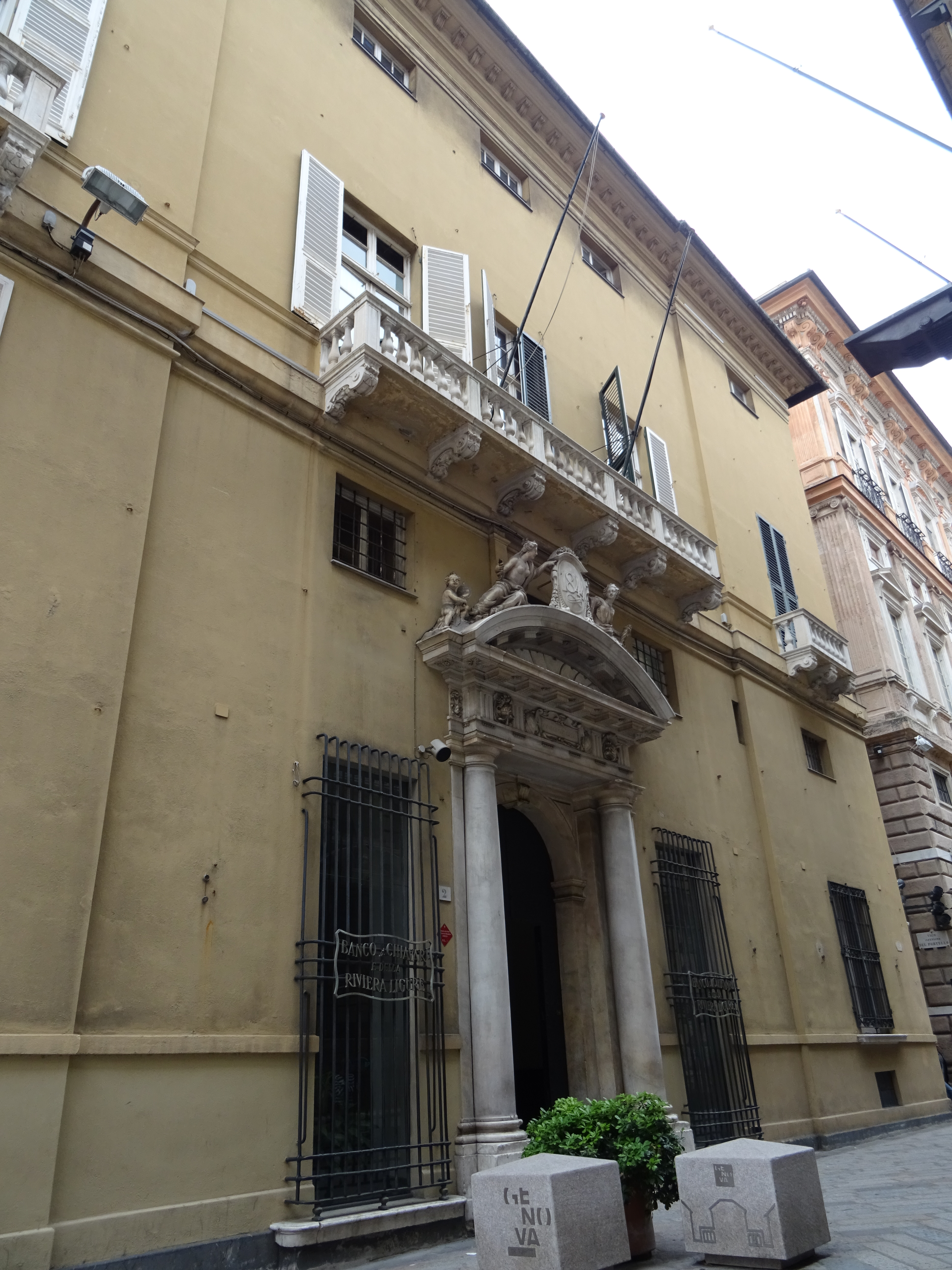
- Facade of the Palazzo Spinola Gambaro in via Garibaldi 2
- Interactive map of the Palazzo Spinola Gambaro area
- Alternative names: Palazzo Pantaleo Spinola

General information
- Status: In use
- Type: Palace
- Architectural style: Mannerist
- Location: Genoa, Italy, 2 Via Garibaldi
- Coordinates: 44.4109°N 8.934736°E
- Current tenants: offices
- Construction started: 1558
- Completed: 1558

Design and construction
- Architects: Bernardo Spazio, Pietro Orsolino

UNESCO World Heritage Site
- Part of: Genoa: Le Strade Nuove and the system of the Palazzi dei Rolli
- Criteria: Cultural: (ii)(iv)
- Reference: 1211
- Inscription: 2006 (30th Session)

The palazzo Pantaleo Spinola or palazzo Gambaro is a building located in via Garibaldi (Genoa) at number 2 in the historical centre of Genoa, included on 13 July 2006 in the list of the 42 palaces inscribed in the Rolli di Genova that became World Heritage by UNESCO on that date. The building is now the headquarters of the Banco di Chiavari e della Riviera Ligure.

== History ==
It was built by the architect Bernardo Spazio and then continued by Pietro Orsolino until the end of the work in 1558 for Pantaleo Spinola, who died in 1536 without ever living in the palace. After the Spinola family it was owned by the Giustiniani and then by the Gambaro family, who had the nudity of the figures above the portal covered.

It was included by Rubens in the 1652 edition of Palazzi di Genova.

== Description ==
The façade, with its very simple lines, is enlivened by the rhythm of the windows, the overhang of the balconies and especially the portal surmounted by two marble statues, allegories of Prudence and Vigilance. The ground floor is richly frescoed with biblical episodes painted in the first decades of the Seventeenth century by Giovanni Carlone: Susanna and the Old Men, The Judgement of Solomon, The End of Assalon. It was one of the elder Carlone’s last works, still lagging behind late Mannerist stylistic features. The glass compass, made in 1923, in Dèco forms, is remarkable.

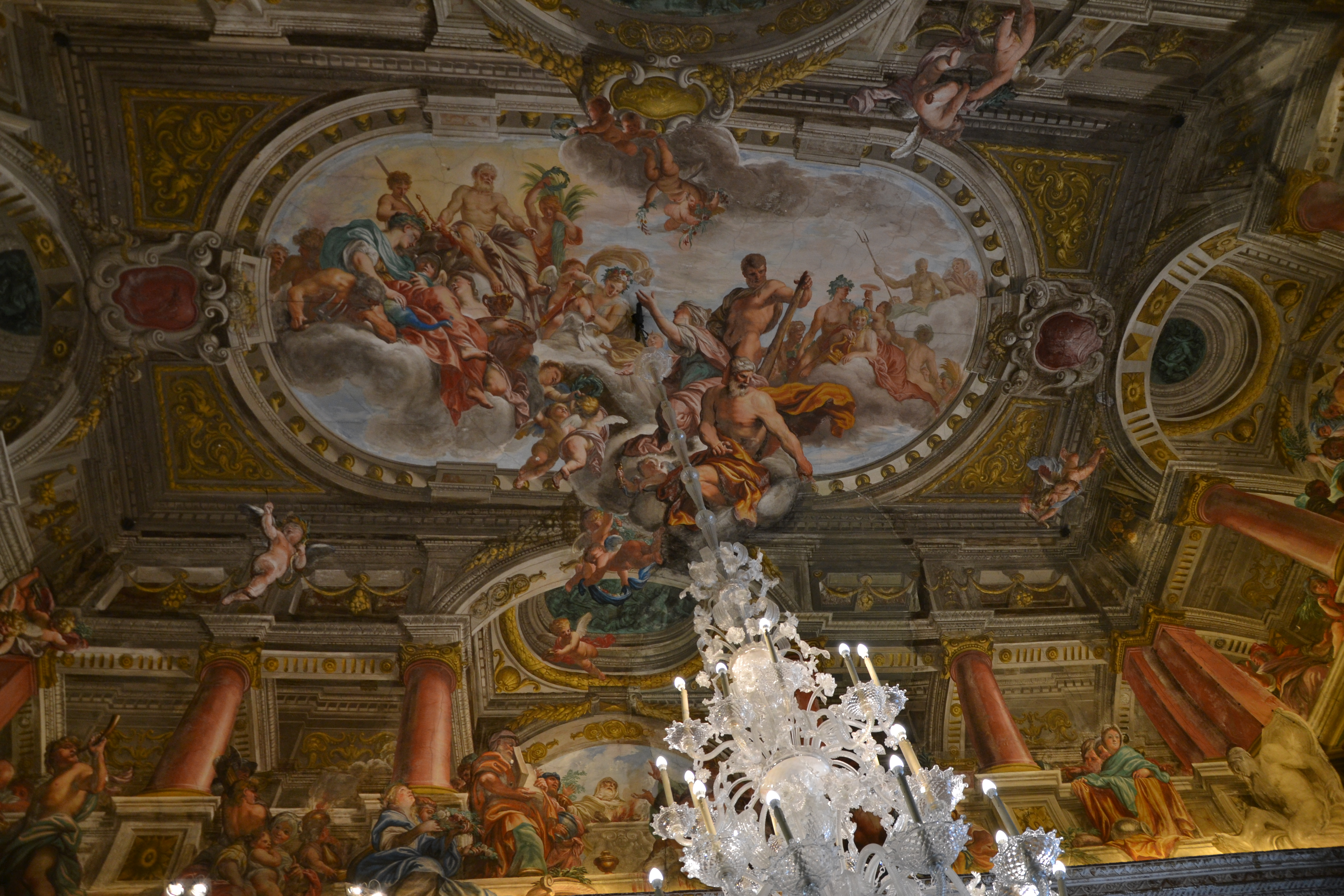
Domenico Parodi, Il ninfeo nel cortile

On the upper floor are 16th century frescoes by the Semino and Calvi brothers. The most famous works, however, are the fresco cycles by Domenico Piola and Giovanni Battista Carlone, among the highest achievements of Genoese Baroque. In the hall on the piano nobile, accessed by climbing an elegant staircase, the volta was frescoed at the end of the 17th century, with a mythological subject depicting The offering to Jupiter of the keys of the temple of Janus, with an allegorical meaning extolling peace, executed by the Genoese Domenico Piola and the Emilian Paolo Brozzi, a specialist in perspective quadratures. The decorations in the other salons are also inspired by Roman history. Again Piola, a dominant artist in the second half of the 17th century in Genoa, is the author of the vault with The Sibyls show the Virgin Mary to Augustus, a Christian reinterpretation of pagan themes, surrounded by episodes depicting The Seasons. Giovanni Battista Carlone was active in two other salons, with Episodes from the Life of Lucretia (Ancient Rome), Coriolanus, and the Rape of the Sabine Women'.

The salon leads to the terrace, in whose nymphaeum once housed the famous marble group depicting the Abduction of Elena, one of the masterpieces of Baroque sculpture executed by the Marseillais Pierre Puget and now housed in the Museum of St. Augustine.

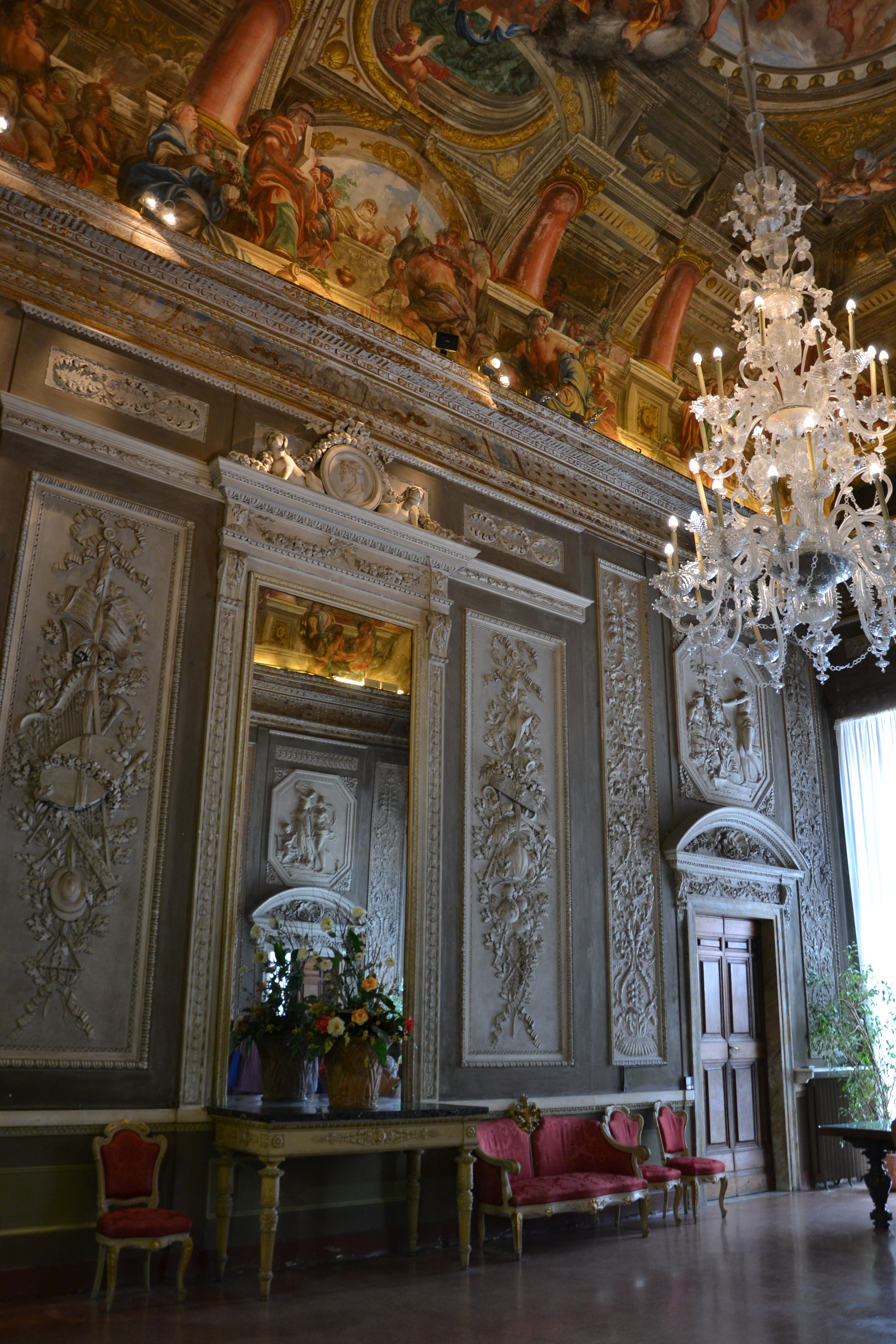
Central Hall

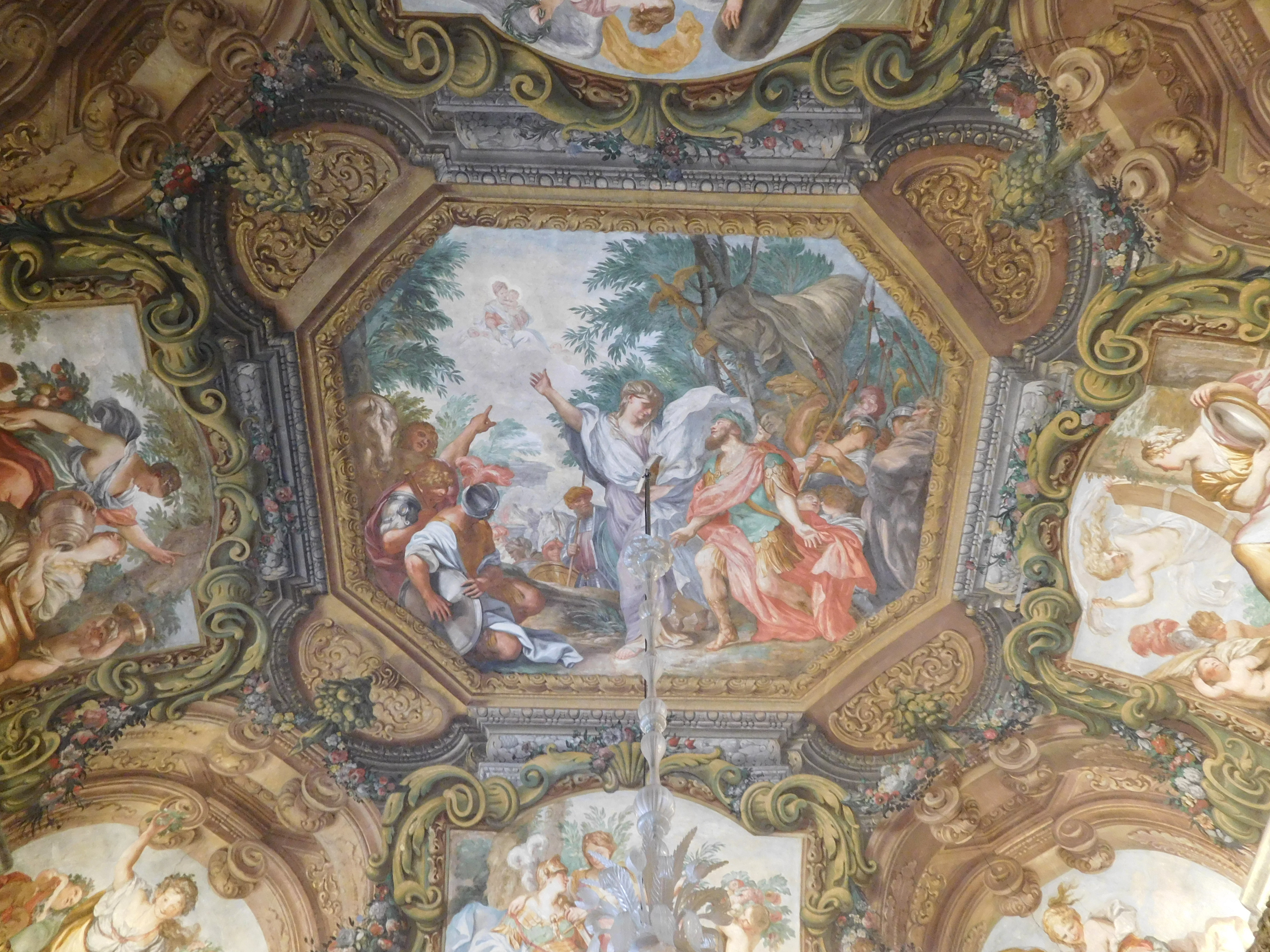
Pierola, The Sibyls show the Virgin Mary to Augustus.

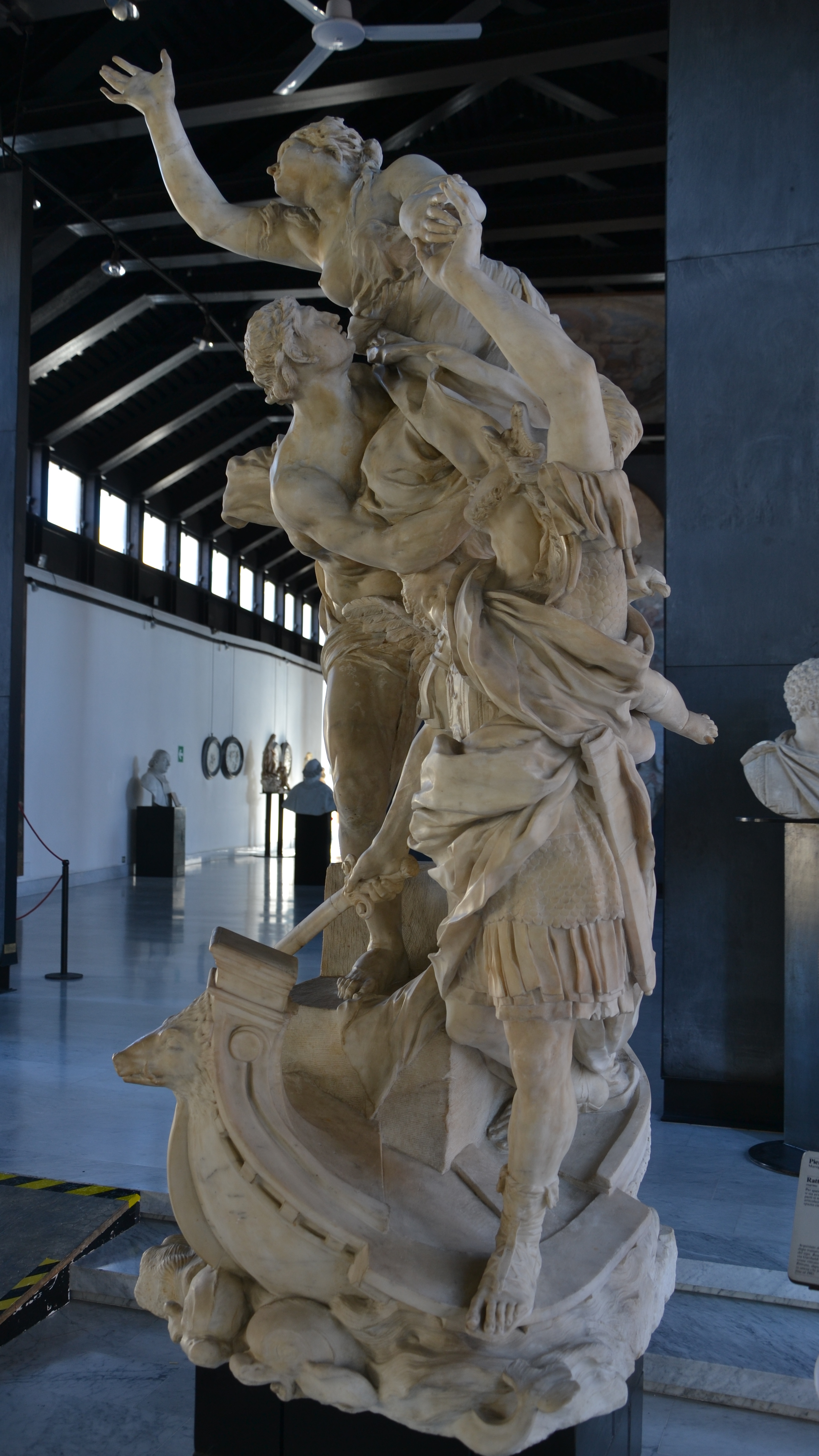
Pierre Puget, Rape of Helen

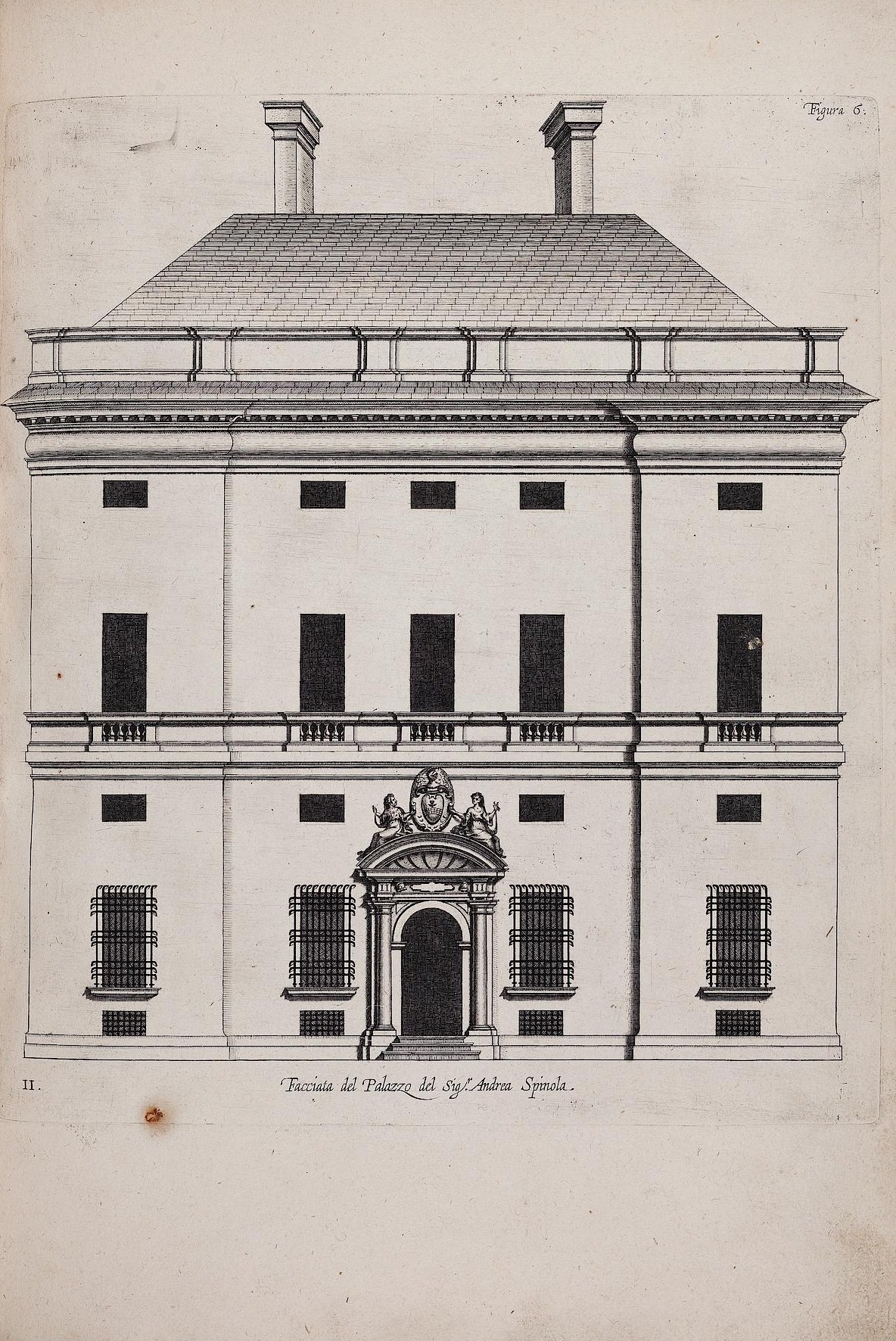
Rubens, Palazzi di Genova

== Sources ==
=== Italian sources ===
- G. Bozzo, Palazzo Spinola Gambaro. Banco di Chiavari e della Riviera Ligure, Genova 2000
- E. Poleggi, Genova una civiltà di palazzi, Cinisello Balsamo (Milano) 2002, pp. 72–73 (Palazzo di Tommaso Spinola di Luccoli (1558–1561)).
- E. Poleggi, L’invenzione dei Rolli, catalogo della mostra, Genova 2004.
