= Ecliptica (disambiguation) =

Ecliptica is an album by Sonata Arctica.

Ecliptica may also refer to:

- "Eclíptica", a 2008 composition by David Padrós
- Ecliptica, a demo by Tristar and Red Sector Incorporated
- P. ecliptica, a species of moth of Australia

== See also ==
- Ecliptic, the apparent path of the sun on the celestial sphere relative to the Earth's center
