= Brozzi =

Brozzi is an Italian surname. Notable people with the surname include:

- Bernardino Brozzi (1555–1617), Italian painter
- Paolo Brozzi (17th century), Italian painter
- Renato Brozzi (1887–1963), Italian sculptor

== See also ==
- Bozzi
