= Leonard E. H. Williams =

- Born: Leonard Edmund Henry Williams; 6 December 1919; Acton, London, England
- Died: 9 June 2007 (aged 87); England
- Military career
- Allegiance: United Kingdom
- Branch: Royal Air Force
- Unit: No. 225 Squadron RAF
- Conflicts: Second World War
- Awards: Distinguished Flying Cross

Leonard Edmund Henry Williams, CBE, DFC (6 December 1919 – 9 June 2007) was the former chief of the Nationwide building society, also known for his career as a Spitfire pilot in the Royal Air Force during the Second World War.

== Early life and RAF career ==
Williams was born in Acton, London to a labourer and a cook. He won a scholarship to Acton County Grammar, leaving at 16 to train as an accountant at Acton Borough Council. On the outbreak of the Second World War, he joined the Royal Air Force (RAF) and was trained as a mechanic. After a time servicing Westland Wapiti biplanes in India, he was selected for pilot training. Posted to Southern Rhodesia (now Zimbabwe), Leading Aircraftman Williams became involved in the wider British Commonwealth Air Training Plan and joined the Initial Training Wing at Hillside, a suburb of Bulawayo. Basic flying training took place at RAF Induna and advanced flying training at Thornhill.

On 14 August 1943, Williams was commissioned into the Royal Air Force Volunteer Reserve as a pilot officer and sent to the Middle East, where he gained experience of single-seat fighter aircraft. On 25 February 1944, he was posted to No. 225 Squadron RAF, at the time based at Lago airfield, 30 miles north of Naples, and equipped with Supermarine Spitfire Mk.V fighters. Williams flew his first operational sortie spotting for Allied artillery firing on a bridge at Ausonia, Lazio on 8 April 1944.

Promoted to the rank of flying officer, Williams flew with No. 225 Squadron all through 1944 from a number of airstrips in Italy, Corsica and southern France. On 23 October that year he took off from Peretola with Flying Officer Stanley Waldman (brother of TV producer Ronnie Waldman) as wingman, to carry out a tactical reconnaissance to the Bologna-Ferrara-Cento-San Giovanni in Persiceto area. What happened on that mission was later narrated by Williams himself:

[...] We were instructed to fly from Peretola up to the river Po and search for places where the German troops might be crossing the river at night by pontoon boats. I was leading the mission. We ran into a lot of Flak over the river and after noting one or two likely spots I turned towards our second objective which was Modena – my companion and I had become separated. My radio had failed and I could see nothing of the other aircraft. Fortunately he in due course returned safely to Peretola.
On the route towards Modena I decided to attack a German Army truck moving on its own towards the city. It was a bad decision because it turned out to be armed with a battery of four 20 mm cannons. They opened up and my Spitfire was hit – I do not know precisely where.
However, taking the view that "discretion is the better part of valour", I broke off and began to climb towards the Apennines, going into the cloud as I did so. Above the cloud (and above the mountains) I set a course in direction of Florence but after a while the engine began to misbehave and I decided it was best to get out. I had a bit of difficulty but after what seemed an age, I dropped clear. I did not see what happened to the aircraft.
I landed very near to a farmhouse and was picked up and carried indoors by a farmer (after he had established I was "inglese") and invited to join him in a bottle of eau de vie I believe he had distilled in the morning. We were enjoying ourselves merrily when a South African Tank Corps Major arrived and in due course drove me back to my Squadron.

Due to injuries sustained during his parachute jump, Williams was later admitted to hospital for some time. In January 1945, he was awarded the Distinguished Flying Cross. The citation reads:

This officer has displayed commendable efficiency and gallantry in the course of numerous reconnaissance sorties […] On one occasion, his aircraft was damaged by heavy and concentrated anti-aircraft fire, but F/O Williams completed his mission before abandoning his aircraft by parachute. Many of his sorties have proved of great value to the army in the field.

== Postwar career ==
After the war, Williams qualified as an accountant and joined the Gas Council as chief internal auditor, then became finance officer of what was then the Cooperative Permanent Society in 1954. He stayed with the company for the remainder of his career, rising through the ranks to become chief executive in 1967 and chairman in 1982, by which time it had become the Nationwide Building Society.

Williams became the best-known and most widely quoted spokesman for the building societies movement as deputy chairman, then chairman, of the Building Societies Association (BSA) from 1977 to 1981. He had the uncomfortable task of presiding over the BSA's decision to introduce the highest ever mortgage rate – 15 per cent – but at the same time he was an advocate of dismantling the building society interest rate cartel and the recommended mortgage rate system. He was appointed a Commander of the Order of the British Empire (CBE) in the 1981 Birthday Honours. In 1986, the Nationwide became the first society to take advantage of the opportunities opened up by the Building Societies Act 1986 to broaden out into banking services. The same year the society, by then the third biggest in the league, merged with the seventh largest society, Anglia. Williams served as chairman, then president, of the Nationwide Anglia until 1992. Among other appointments, he served as chairman of BUPA from 1988 to 1990. Under his leadership, Nationwide supported air tattoos and the RAF Benevolent Fund. Moreover, Williams was a life member of the RAF Club, of which he also served as a vice-chairman.

== Discovery and excavation of Spitfire crash site ==
The remains of Williams' Spitfire were recovered in Galciana, Tuscany in late 2002. The aircraft was identified as an LF Mk.IX, s/n MH 768, equipped with a Merlin 66 engine and delivered on 19 September 1943 to 39 Maintenance Unit. On 24 October 1943 it was loaded onto SS Charlton Hall and shipped to Casablanca, where it arrived the following 17 November. On 30 November it was assigned to 218 Group and employed on tactical reconnaissance missions in North Africa. From 28 September 1944 it was allotted to 225 Squadron operating from Peretola airfield.

On 23 October 1944 it was shot down by Flak and abandoned by the pilot. It received Category E damage and subsequently it was stricken off register. The serial number also proved to be decisive in tracking down the pilot, who was able to return to the town exactly 59 years after the crash. To this day, the wreckage of Spitfire MH 768 is on display in the Gothic Line Museum in Montemurlo.

== Bibliography ==
RAF News, 14 November 2003.
Intercom, Spring 2004.
