= Peretola =

Village near Florence, Italy

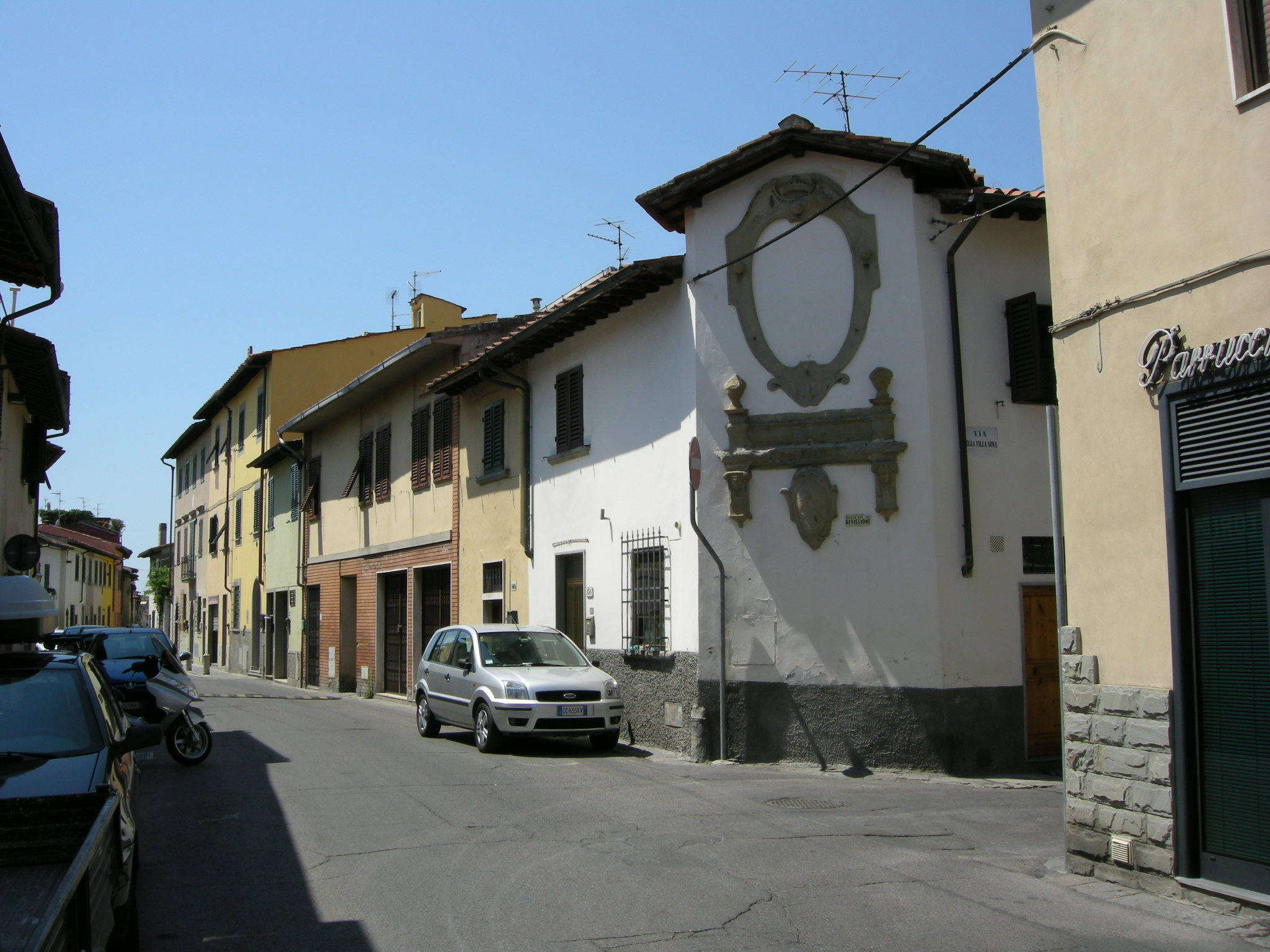
- Peretola Street
- Coordinates: 43°47′49.2″N 11°11′47.65″E
- City: Florence
Region
- Country: Italy

Population
  - Total: 2,500
- Area code: 055

Peretola is a suburb of Florence, Italy, located on the northern extremity of the Florentine commune. It belongs administratively to Quartiere 5 - Rifredi. It lends its name to the nearby international airport.

== History ==
The village of Peretola was founded in the Middle Ages. It was greatly developed during the Florentine Renaissance of the 15th century, as it sat in a strategic location between two great communication roads, the via Pistoiese and the via Pratese. For much of its history, the village of Peretola was a dependency of the autonomous commune of Brozzi, until 1928, when the latter's communal status was suppressed and its territories partitioned. Peretola fell into portion assigned to the commune of Florence, and was integrated into the administrative ward of Quartiere 5 (Rifredi).

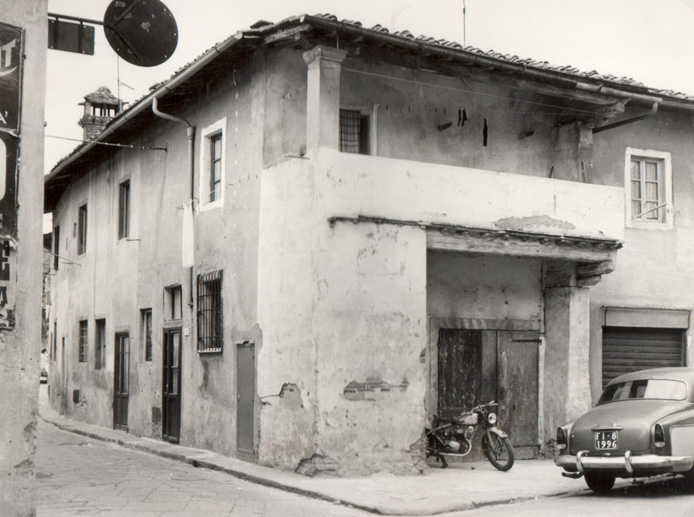
Amerigo Vespucci house in Peretola

A house in Peretola (No. 8, on the corner of via Peretola and via del Campagnie) is claimed to be the original home of the Vespucci family, and birthplace of the celebrated navigator Amerigo Vespucci (although Amerigo Vespucci was raised in their urban home in the Ognissanti quarter of the city of Florence proper).

Peretola is also the native village of Tommaso Masini, nicknamed the "Zoroaster of Peretola", a friend and collaborator of Leonardo da Vinci.

Giovanni Boccaccio set the tale of "Chichibio e la gru" (Decameron, VI, 4) in the village of Peretola.

Niccolò Machiavelli, in his novella, Belfagor arcidiavolo, tells the story of a demon which had been sent from Hell to Florence to investigate the excuses of its incorrigibly corrupt and wicked citizens (the Florentines blame their wives). The demon sets himself up in grand style with a Florentine wife, but quickly finds himself overwhelmed by her demands and flees to Peretola to seek refuge and restore his peace of mind. Machiavelli characterizes Peretola as a small rural paradise, an escape from the morass of Florence, a pleasant haven even for the devil.

== Monuments ==
The old village of Peretola is composed of narrow streets, typical of a Tuscan country village, dotted with shrines, and a typical rural housing scheme organized around numerous short courtyards. Some of these courtyards date from the 14th century, but most are from 17th and 18th centuries.

Peretola's center is at Piazza Garibaldi, on which sits the old Church of Santa Maria a Peretola, with its 1443 terra-cotta tabernacle by Luca della Robbia and a 1446 baptismal fountain by Francesco di Simone Ferrucci. Nearby is the Oratorio della Santissima Annunziata, built in 1821, a rare example of neoclassical architecture in the region.

Just outside the old village is the 1510 chapel of Santa Maria Vergine della Pietà, with an octagonal-shaped dome, in imitation of the Florence cathedral. Nicknamed la cupolina, the chapel was once in open fields, but now is circulated by vehicular traffic from the via Pratese.

== Gallery ==
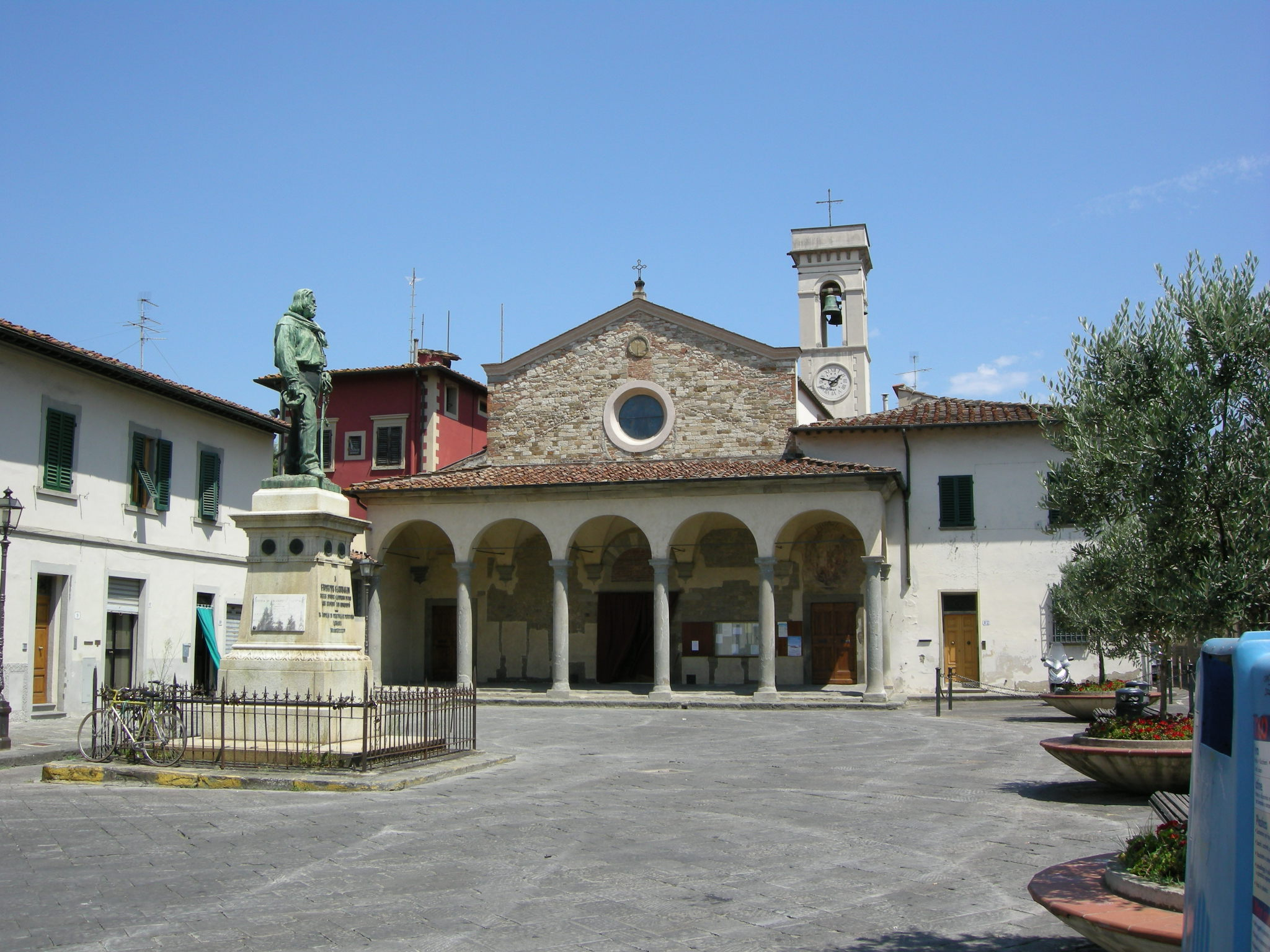
Santa Maria a Peretola

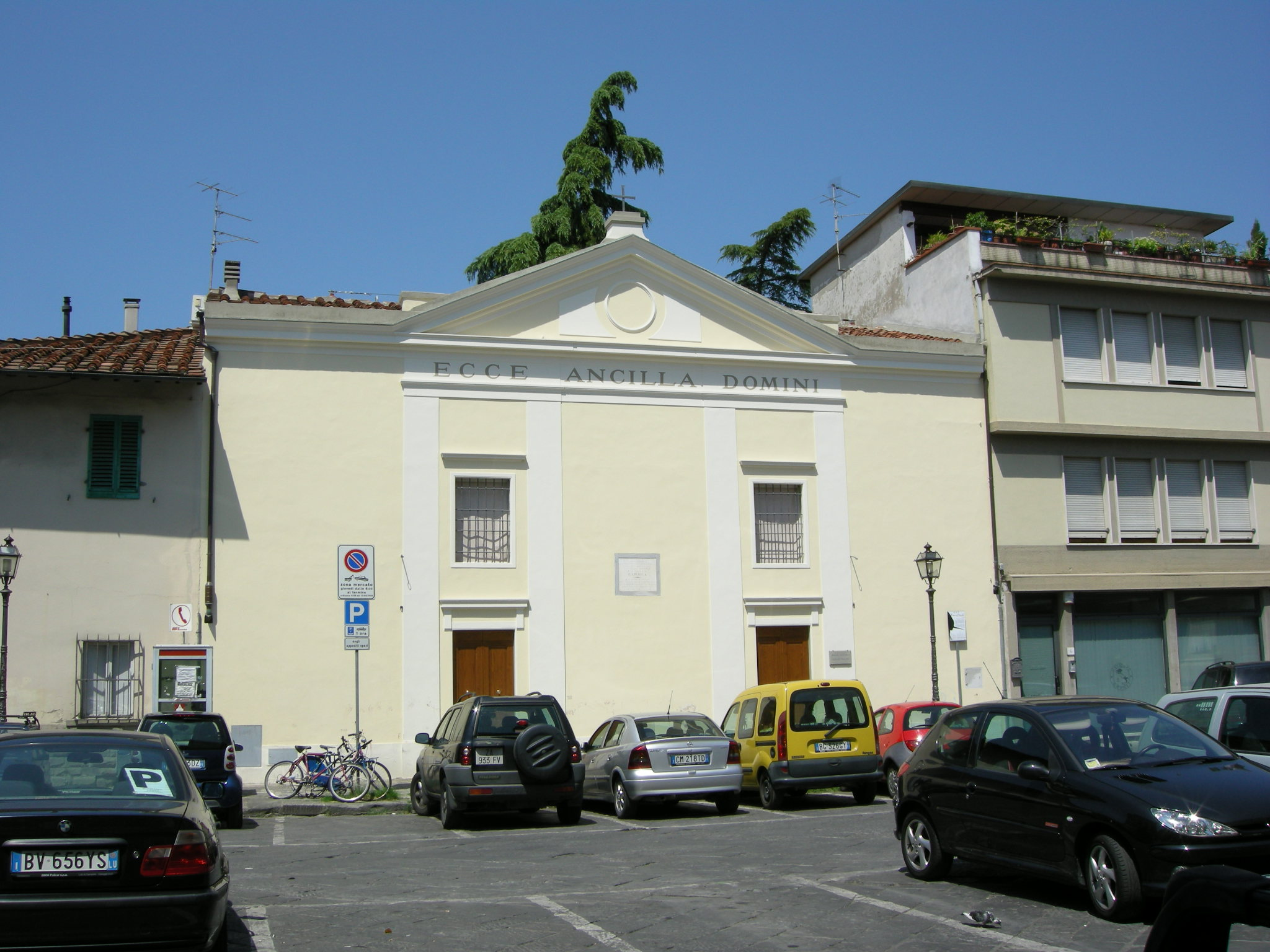
Oratorio della santissima annunziata

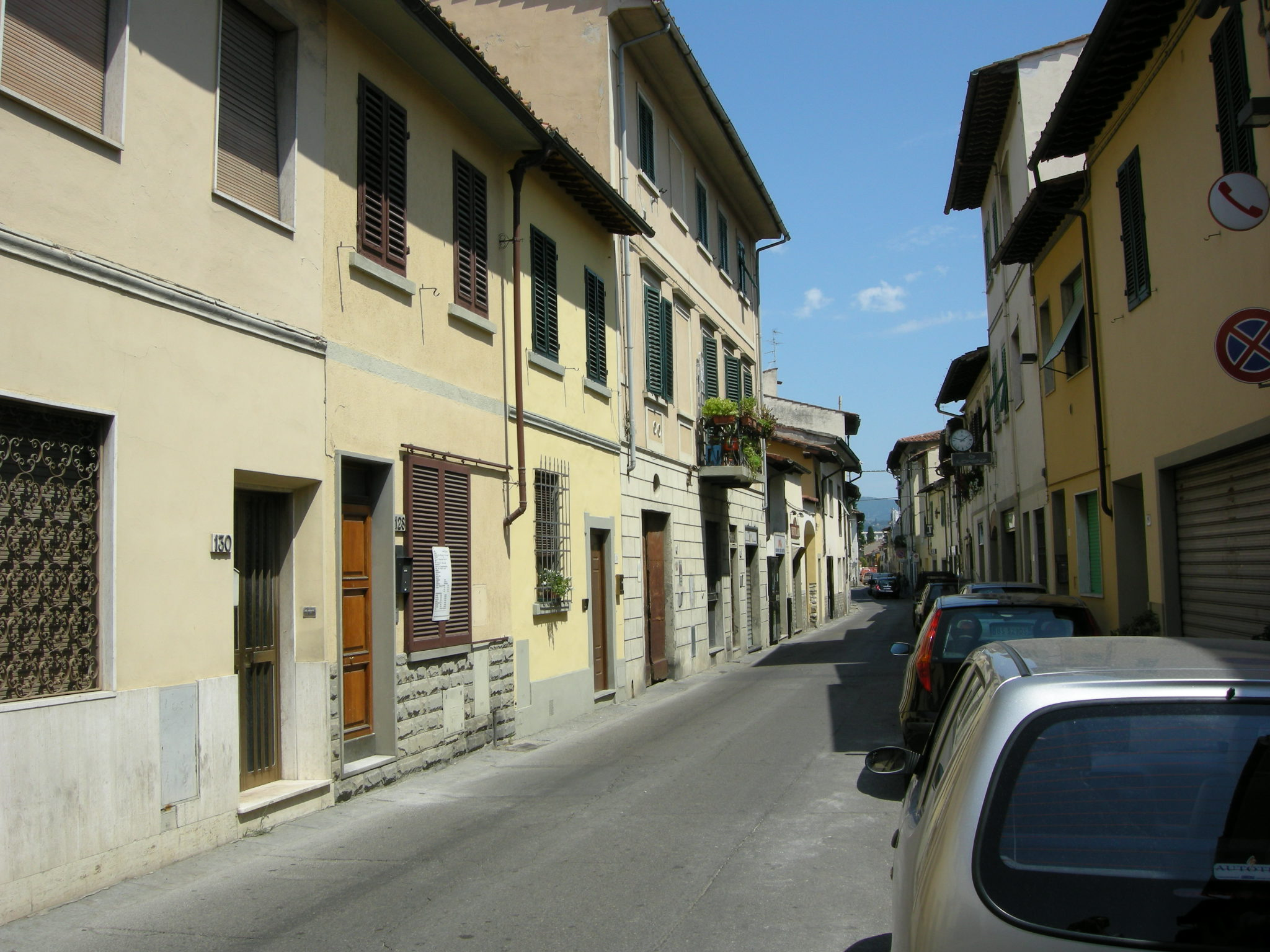
Peretola street

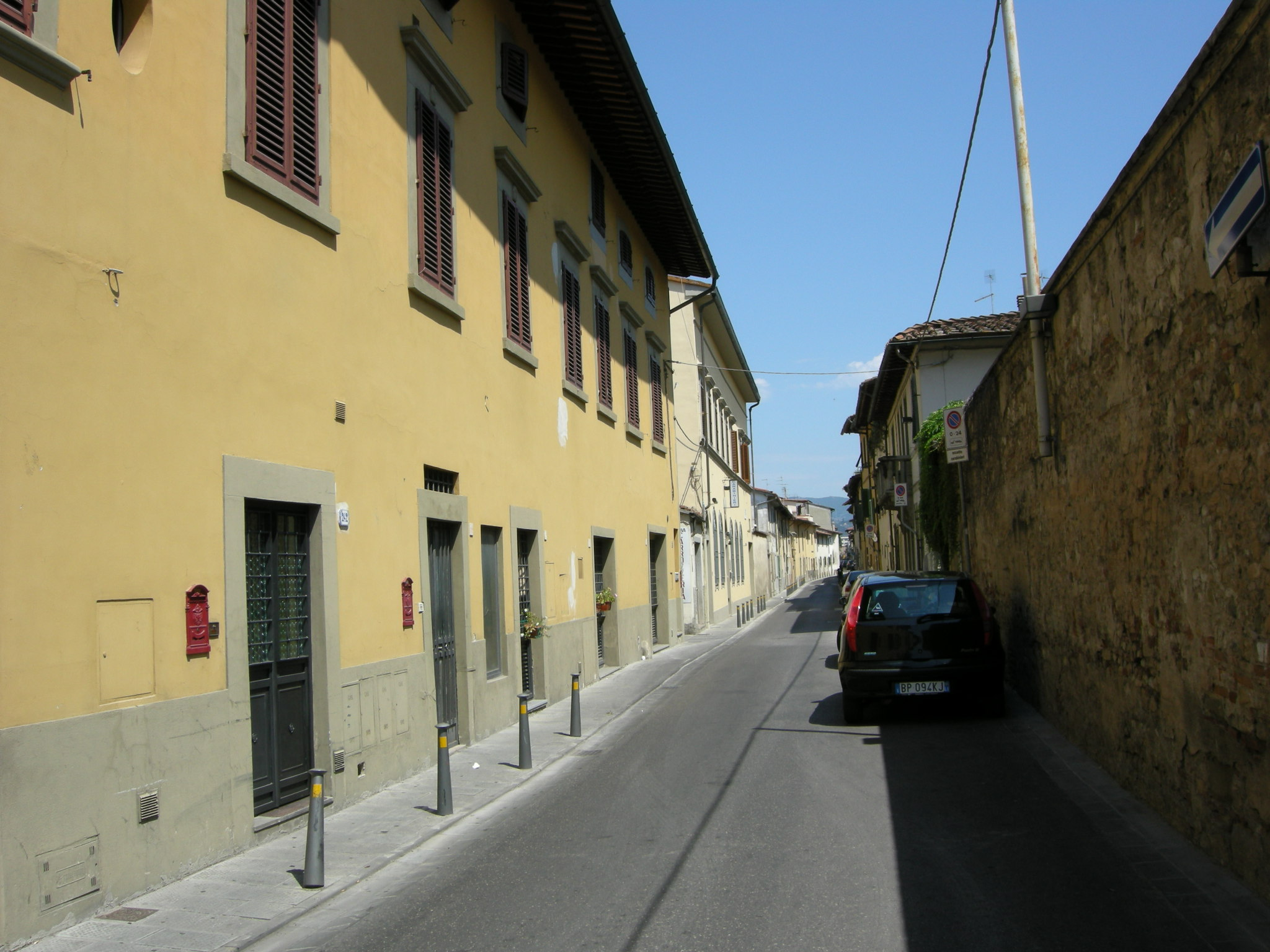
Peretola street

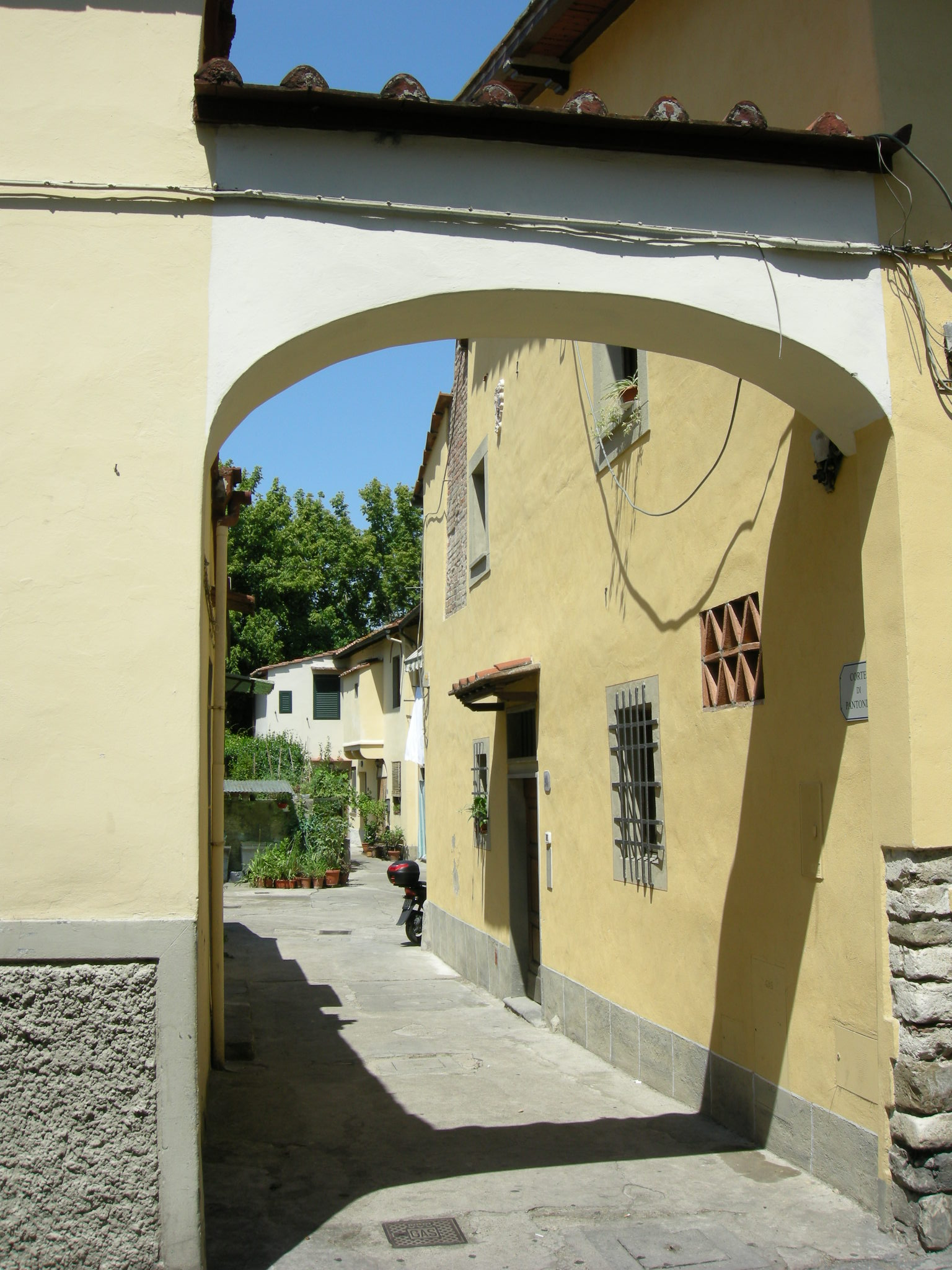
Courtyard

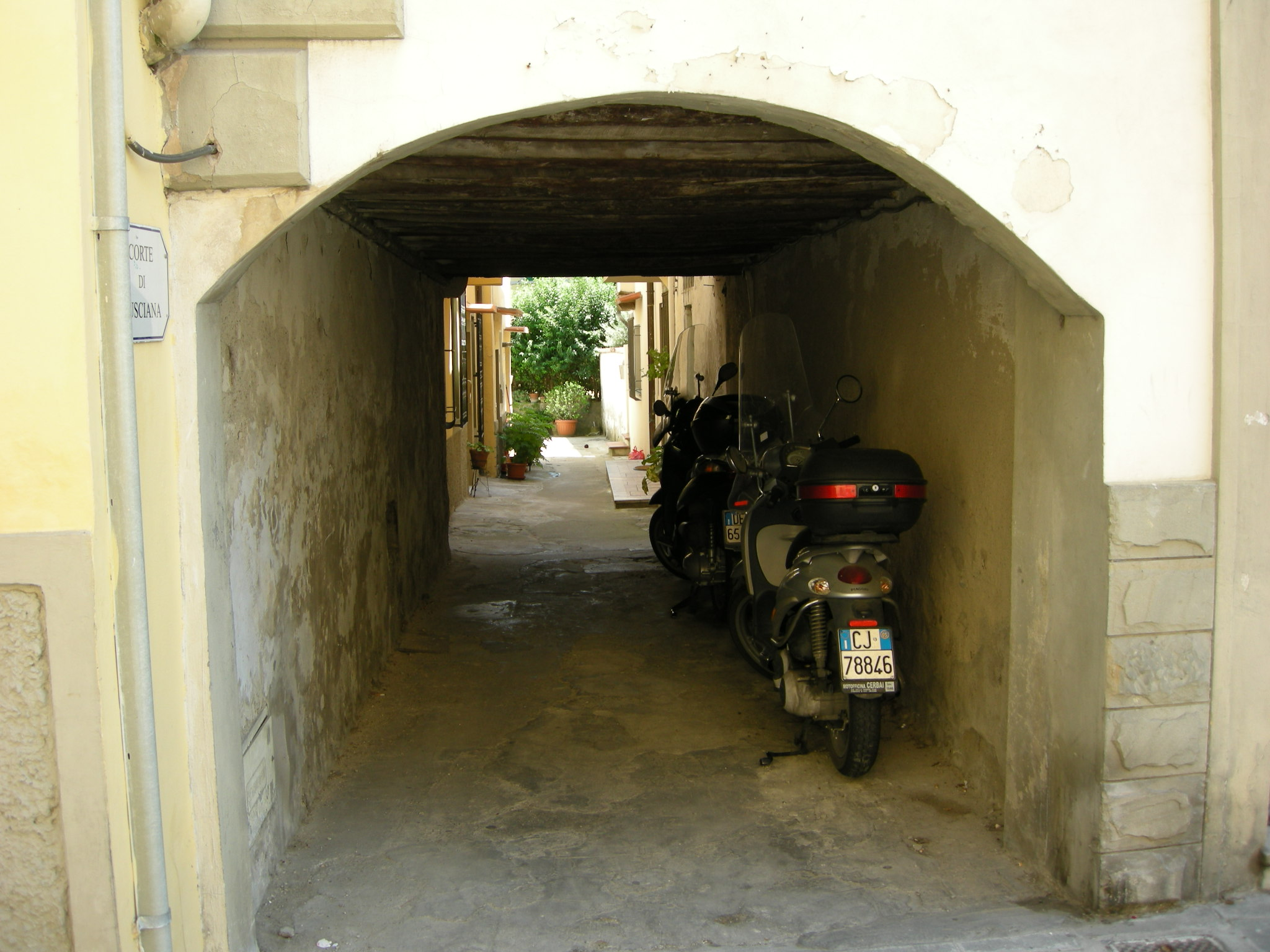
Courtyard

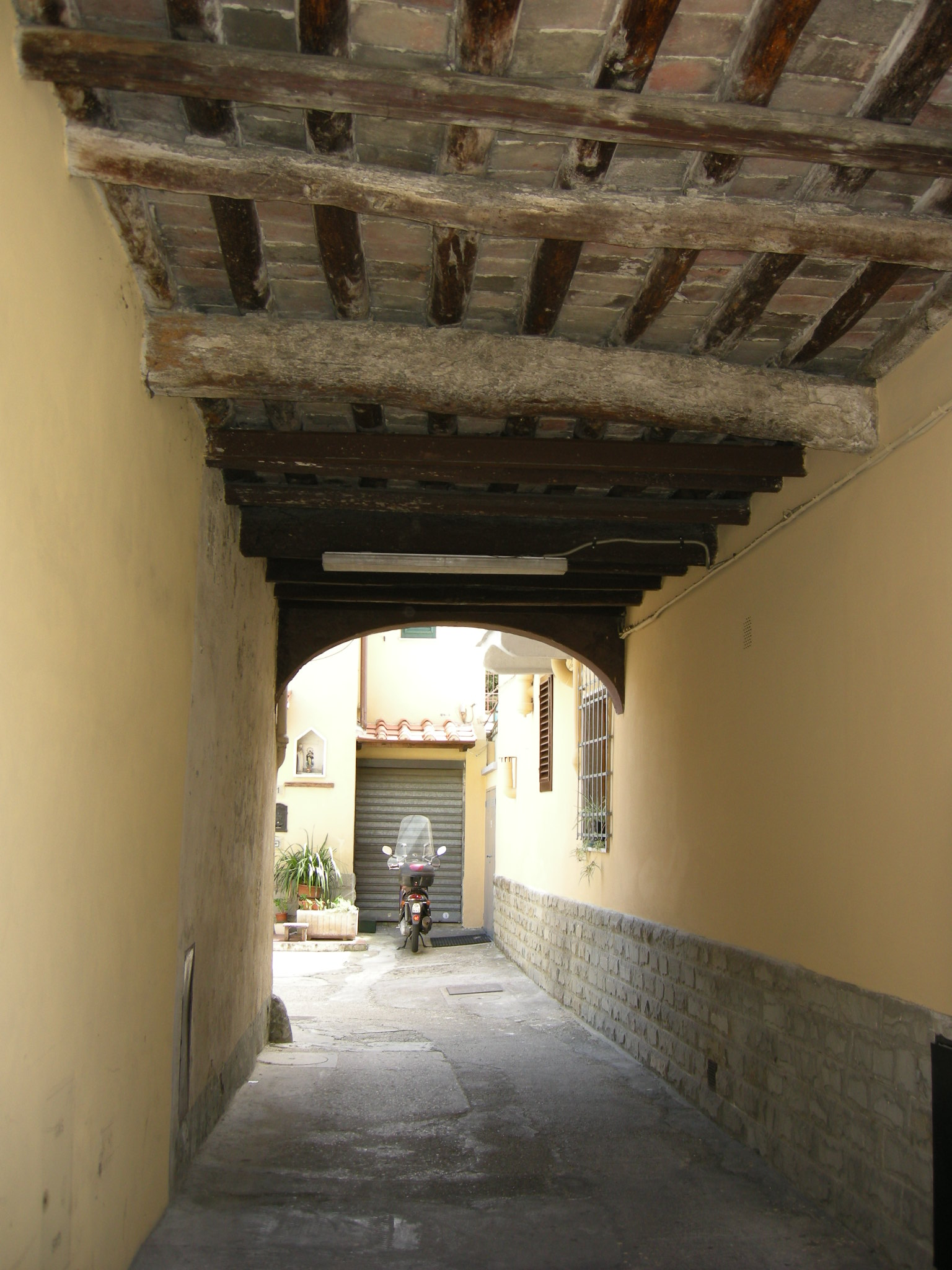
Courtyard

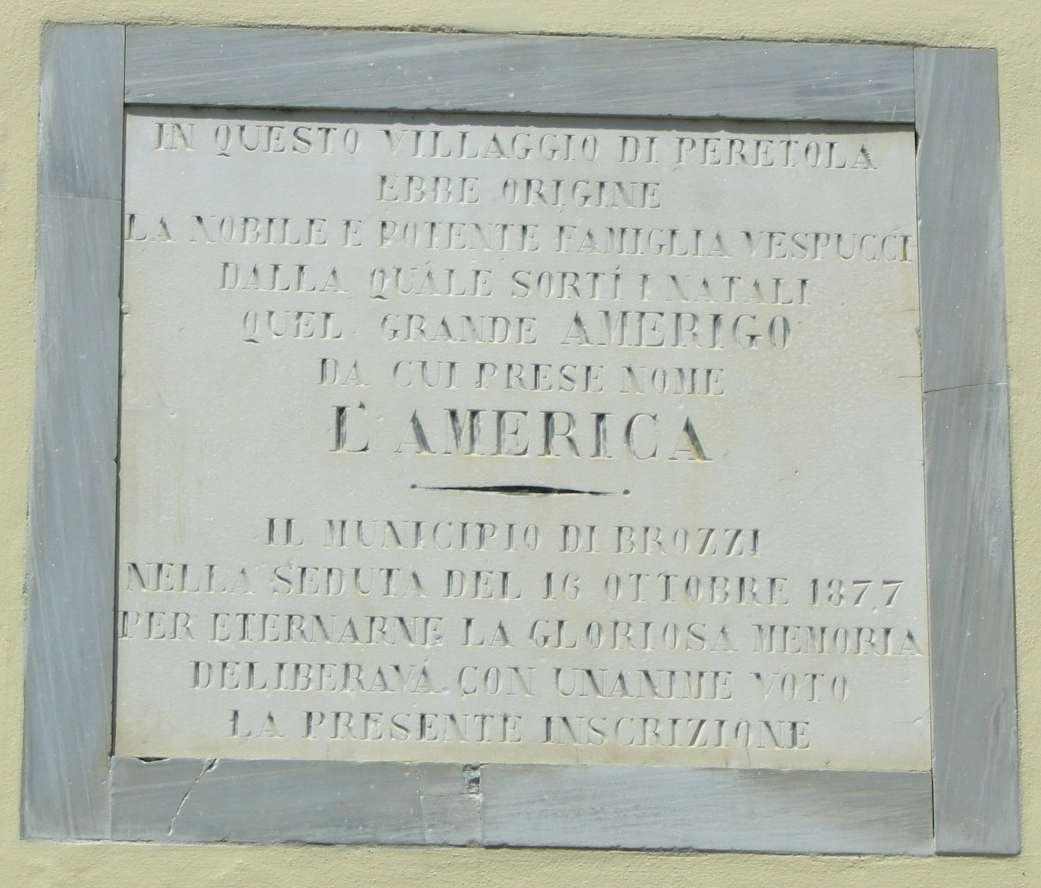
Amerigo Vespucci plaque

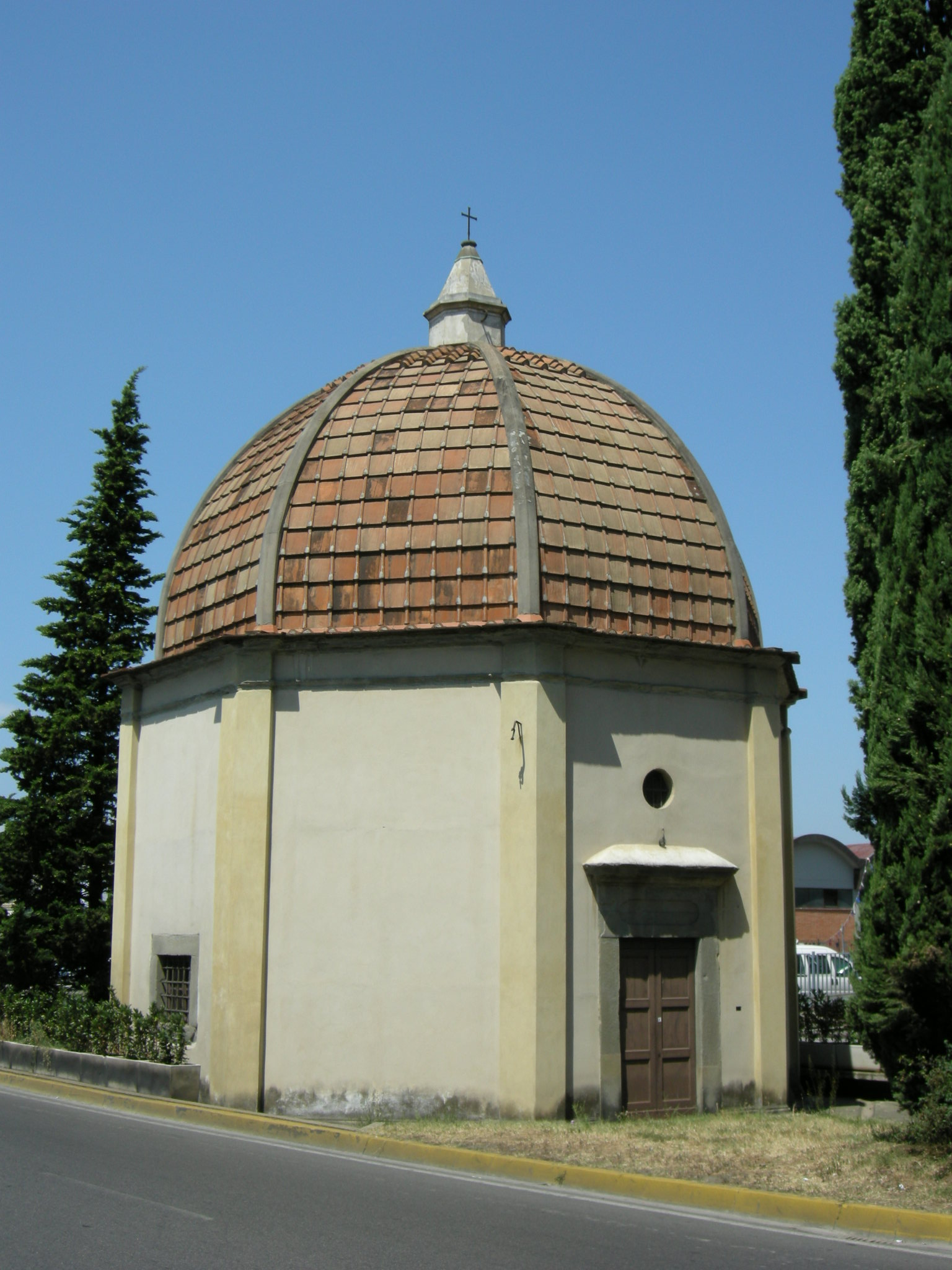
Oratorio di Santa Maria Vergine della Pietà

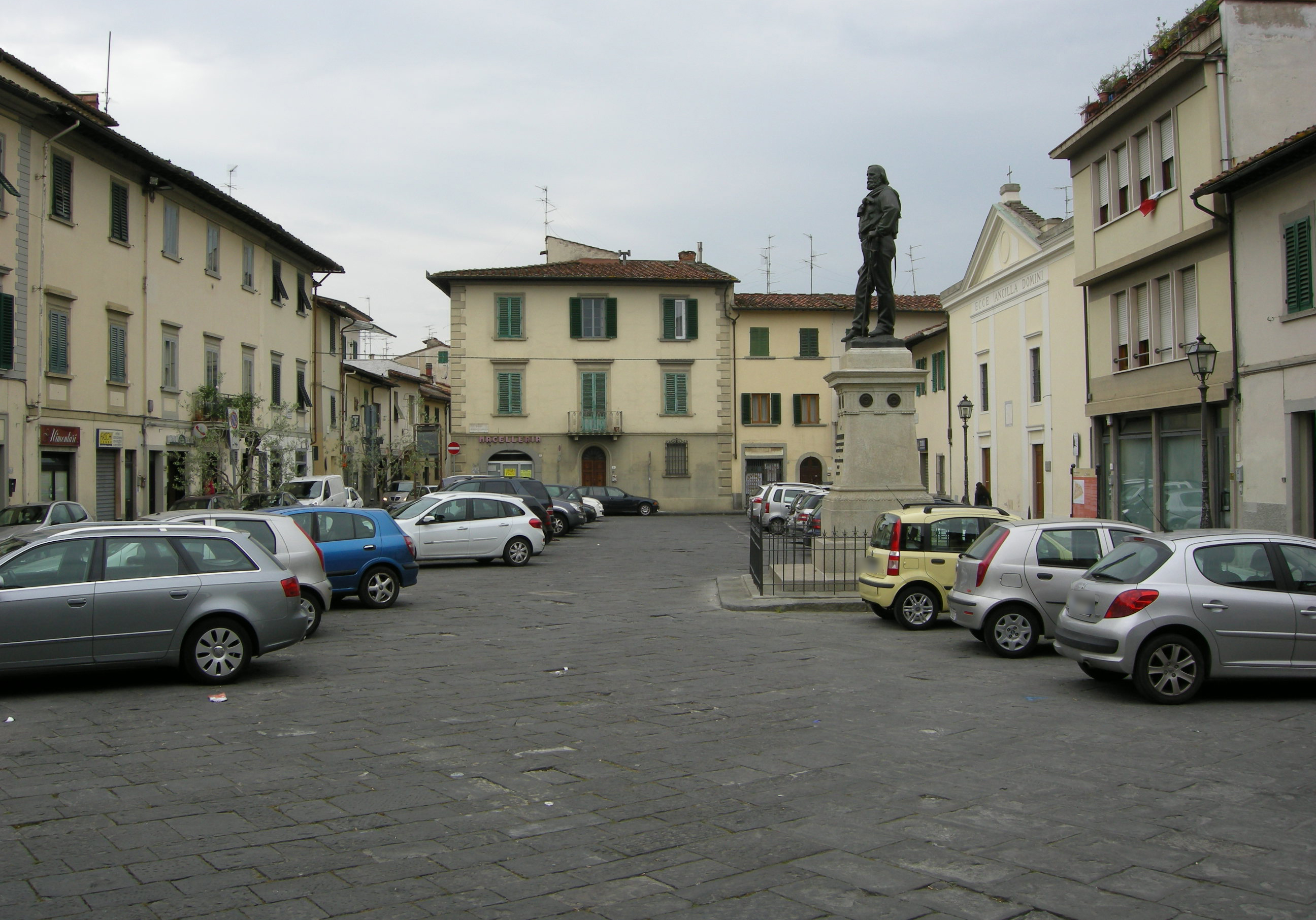
Piazza Garibaldi
