= Bob Rogers (SAAF officer) =

South African Air Force general

Lieutenant General Bob Rogers MMM DSO
- Born: 7 November 1921; Warden, Orange Free State, South Africa
- Died: 3 June 2000 (aged 78); Cape Town, South Africa
- Spouse: Clare Bosch
- Military career
- Allegiance: South Africa
- Branch: South African Air Force
- Rank: Lieutenant General
- Service number: 106121/102299V
- Commands: Chief of the South African Air Force; 24 Squadron SAAF; 12 Squadron SAAF; 40 Squadron SAAF; No. 225 Squadron RAF
- Wars: Second World War; Korean War
- Awards: Star of South Africa SSAG Southern Cross Medal SM Military Merit Medal MMM Korea Medal (South Africa) Pro Patria Medal Good Service Medal Union Medal Distinguished Service Order DSO Distinguished Flying Cross and Bar (United Kingdom) DFC & Bar 1939–45 Star War Medal 1939–1945 War Medal 1939 – 1945 MID Africa Service Medal (WWII) Distinguished Flying Cross DFC Air Medal Order of Military Merit Order Military Merit Korean War Service Medal Order of Military Merit (무공훈장) United Nations Service Medal Presidential Unit Citation
- Other work: Member of Parliament

Robert Harry Doherty Rogers MMM DSO (7 November 1921 – 3 June 2000) was a Chief of the South African Air Force. He joined the South African Air Force (SAAF) in 1940, and served in the Second World War and the Korean War. He subsequently rose through the ranks to become Chief of the SAAF. After his military career he entered politics and served as a Member of Parliament.

== Early life and education ==
Rogers was born in Warden in the Orange Free State, South Africa, on 7 November 1921. He won his Springbok (i.e. national) colours for shooting, and later joined the South African Air Force (SAAF), commencing his flying training in January 1941. He matriculated from Maritzburg College in 1938, upon which he enrolled as a medical student at the University of the Witwatersrand until mid-1940, before joining the SAAF as a volunteer for active service in World War II, first qualifying as an air gunner. When he volunteered to train as a pilot, he went to Southern Rhodesia for training.

== Career ==
By October 1941, Rogers was assigned to No. 208 Squadron RAF in Egypt, where he flew Hurricanes and Spitfires in North Africa, Sicily, Italy and Austria. He was shot down near Benghazi in 1942, but managed to escape capture. In August 1942, despite having a finger shot off, he fought off four Luftwaffe ME 109s. By December 1943, he had been promoted to lieutenant colonel and placed in command of No. 225 Squadron RAF. For his services he was awarded the Distinguished Service Order and the Distinguished Flying Cross and Bar. Even his father, who was a captain in the army, had to salute him – much to the delight of both men. Towards the end of World War II, Rogers was put in charge of his old squadron, 40 Squadron SAAF.

After the war, Rogers accepted a permanent commission in the SAAF with the rank of captain, and served in various posts, including as a flight instructor and as Aide-de-Camp to the Governor-General of the Union. Rogers served in the Korean War in 1951 and 1953 as a fighter bomber pilot, flying Mustangs and Sabres. He earned the American Distinguished Flying Cross, Air Medal with oak leaf cluster, and the Korean Order of Military Merit. In 1954, he married Clare Bosch and they had a son.

Rogers went on to hold various command and staff posts, including officer commanding 12 Squadron SAAF and 24 Squadron SAAF and, at the end of 1974, he was appointed Acting Chief of the Air Force. He was promoted lieutenant general in March 1975 when he was confirmed as Chief of the Air Force, the post he held until his retirement in 1979.

== Retirement ==
Rogers retired from the SAAF in 1979 and settled in Knysna, Cape Province. In 1989, he became the Democratic Party MP for Walmer, Port Elizabeth and was defence spokesman for that party in parliament.

== Honours and awards ==
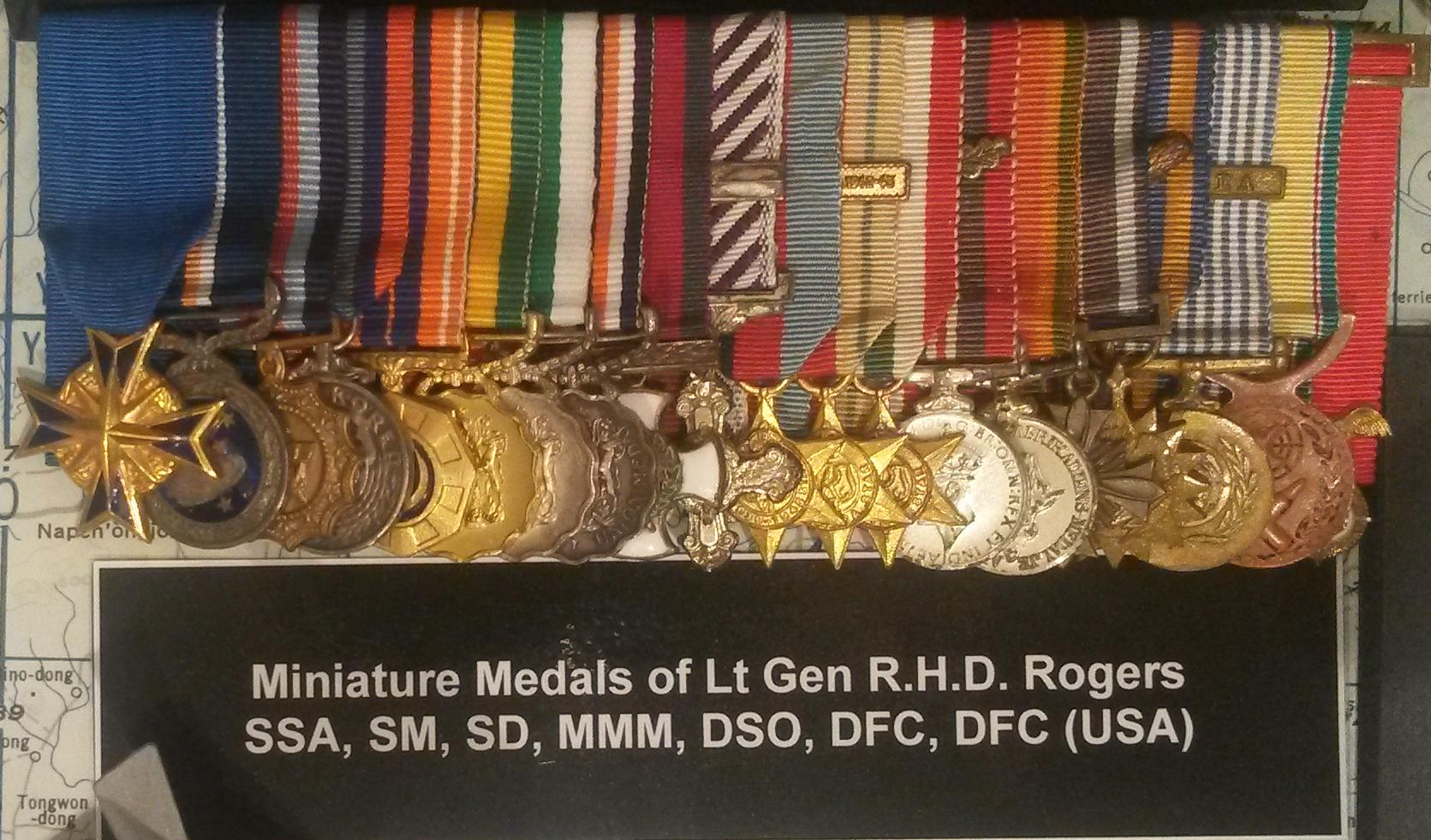
Miniatures of his medals on display at SAAF Museum, Ysterplaat

Rogers was awarded the Distinguished Service Order and Distinguished Flying Cross and Bar for his gallantry in combat operations, as well as being Mentioned in Despatches, during the Second World War. In Korea, he was awarded the American Distinguished Flying Cross, the Air Medal with oak leaf cluster and the South Korean Chungmu Decoration with Gold Star. For service in the SAAF, he was awarded the Order of the Star of South Africa, the Southern Cross Medal and the Chief of Defence Force Commendation (later known as the Medal of Military Merit).

=== List ===
- Star of South Africa (Gold) (SSAG)
- Southern Cross Medal (1952) (SM)
- Military Merit Medal (MMM)
- Korea Medal (South Africa) (South Africa)
- Pro Patria Medal
- Good Service Medal (Gold (30 Years))
- Good Service Medal (Silver (20 Years))
- Union Medal (South Africa)
- Distinguished Service Order (DSO) (Great Britain)
- Distinguished Flying Cross and Bar (United Kingdom) (DFC & Bar) (Great Britain)
- 1939–45 Star (Great Britain)
- Africa Star (Great Britain)
- Italy Star (Great Britain)
- War Medal 1939–1945 (Great Britain)
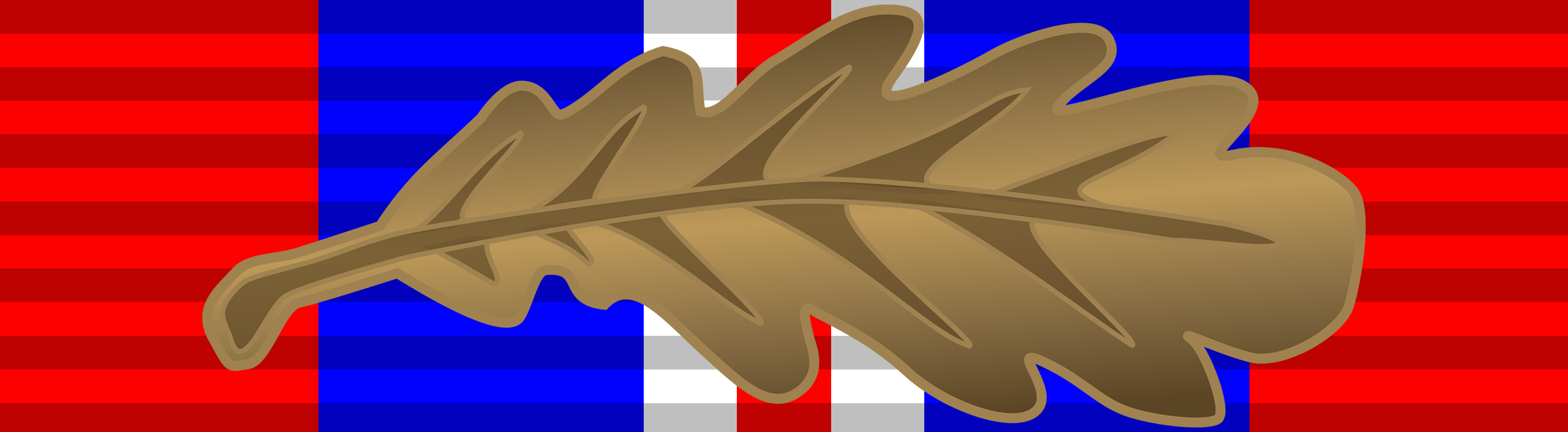
- War Medal 1939 – 1945 (Mentioned in Dispatches) (MID) (South Africa)
- Africa Service Medal (WWII) (South Africa)
- Distinguished Flying Cross (DFC) (USA)
- Air Medal (with Oak leaf cluster) (USA)
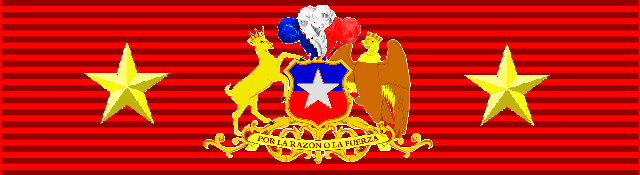
- Order of Military Merit (Grand Officer II) (Brazil)
- Order Military Merit (Grand Cross) (Paraguay)
- Korean War Service Medal (ROK)
- Order of Military Merit (무공훈장) (3rd Class - Chungmu Cordon (충무)) (ROK)
- United Nations Service Medal (Korea) (United Nations)
- Presidential Unit Citation (USA)

== See also ==
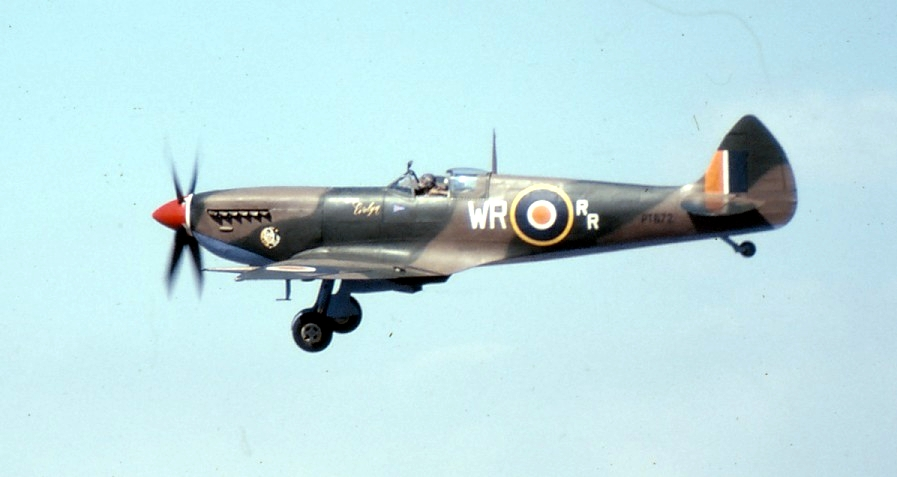
Spitfire Mk IX as flown by Lt. Col R.R. (Bob) Rogers while OC 40 Squadron SAAF. Rogers' aircraft carried the RR marking from 1943 – 1945, based on his initials.

- List of South African military chiefs
- South African Air Force

Military offices
Preceded by Jacobus Verster	Chief of the South African Air Force; 1975–1979	Succeeded by Michal Muller
Unknown	OC 24 Squadron SAAF; Unknown	Unknown
Unknown	OC 12 Squadron SAAF; Unknown	Unknown
Unknown	OC 40 Squadron SAAF; Unknown	Unknown
Unknown	OC No. 225 Squadron RAF; Unknown	Unknown
