= Giovanni Bozzi =

Belgian basketball coach

Spirou Charleroi
- Position: Chairman
- League: Ethias League

Personal information
- Born: May 22, 1963 (age 63)
- Coaching career: 1989–present

Career history

Coaching
- 1989–1991: RBC Verviers-Pepinster
- 1991–2002: Spirou Charleroi
- 2002–2005: Belgian national team
- 2003–2007: Liège Basket
- 2009–2014: Spirou Charleroi

Career highlights
- 6x Belgian League champion (1996–1999, 2004, 2010, 2011); 3x Belgian Cup champion (1996, 1999, 2009); Belgian Supercup champion (2004); 3x Belgian League Coach of the Year (1991, 1998–1999)

Giovanni Bozzi (born May 22, 1963) is a former Belgian professional basketball coach. He is the current chairman of basketball team Spirou Charleroi.

== Career ==
Bozzi started his career with two seasons for RBC Verviers-Pepinster. In 1991 he left for Spirou Charleroi, where he coached for 11 consecutive seasons. In those seasons he won 5 Belgian championships with Spirou. From 2003 till 2007 he was the head coach of Liège Basket. With Liège he won the Belgian league and Supercup in 2004.

In 2009 he returned to his former club, Spirou Charleroi. Bozzi added another 2 Belgian championships to his list of honours. In 2014, he ended his coaching career and become the chairman of Spirou.

== Honours ==
- Belgian Championship (6): 1996, 1997, 1998, 1999, 2004, 2010, 2011
- Belgian Cup (3): 1996, 1999, 2009
- Belgian Supercup (1): 2004
- BLB Coach of the Year (3): 1991, 1998, 1999
