= José Padrós =

Spanish water polo player (born 1947)

Personal information
- Nationality: Spanish
- Born: 22 March 1947 (age 78); Barcelona, Spain

Sport
- Sport: Water polo

José Padrós (born 22 March 1947) is a Spanish water polo player. He competed at the 1968 Summer Olympics and the 1972 Summer Olympics.
