= No. 225 Squadron RAF =

Defunct flying squadron of the Royal Air Force

- Active: 1 April 1918 - 18 December 1918; 11 October 1939 - 7 January 1947; 1 January 1960 - 1 November 1965
- Country: United Kingdom
- Branch: Royal Air Force
- Type: Flying squadron
- Motto: We guide the sword

No. 225 Squadron RAF is a former Royal Air Force squadron.

== History ==
=== World War One ===
No. 225 Squadron RAF was formed on 1 April 1918 at Alimini, Italy from part of No. 6 Wing RNAS, and was equipped with Sopwith Camels. The squadron disbanded on 18 December 1918.

=== World War Two ===
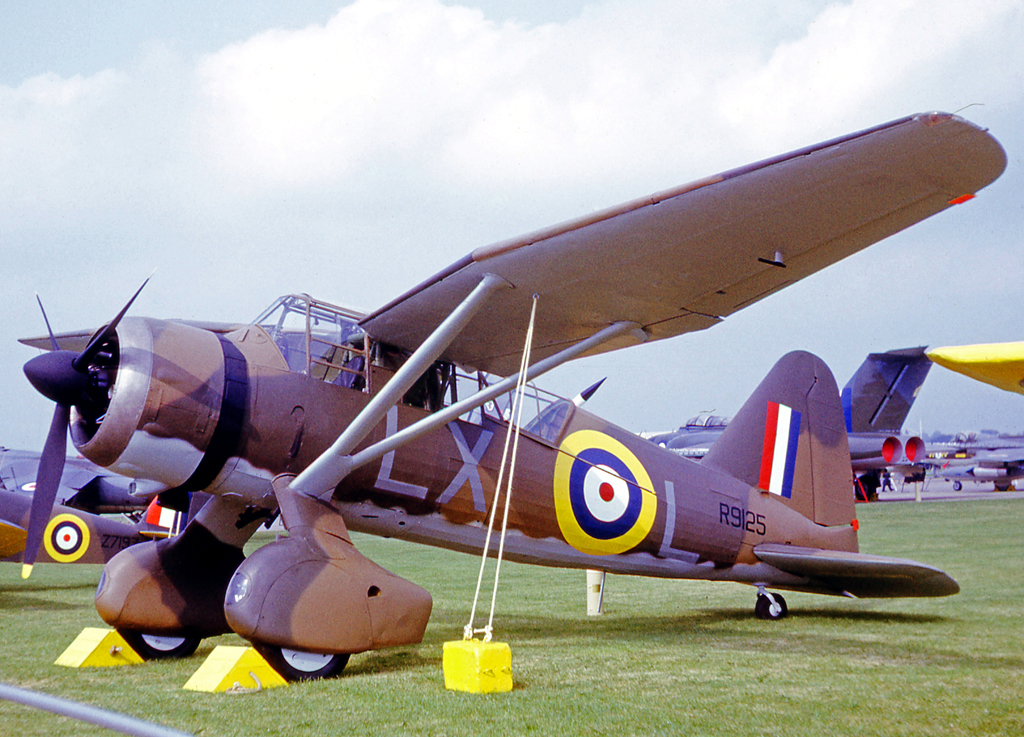
Preserved Westland Lysander III wearing the markings of No. 225 Squadron in 1968. This aircraft had served the squadron in 1940.

On 11 October 1939 the squadron was reformed at Odiham, equipped with Westland Lysanders, from No. 614A Squadron which had been formed on 3 October 1939 from 'B' Flight 614 Squadron. In 1942 the squadron re-equipped with Hawker Hurricanes and North American Mustangs. After participating in the allied invasion of Tunisia "Operation Torch", the squadron began converting to Supermarine Spitfires in January 1943.

In September 1944 the squadron returned to Italy after the invasion of Southern France (Operation Dragoon), where it remained until disbanding on 7 January 1947.

=== Post War ===
It was reformed on 1 January 1960, from the Joint Experimental Helicopter Unit, equipped with Bristol Sycamores and Westland Whirlwinds. The squadron was based at Andover until moving to Odiham in May 1960, and then Malaysia in November 1963. The squadron disbanded on 1 November 1965.

== Aircraft operated ==
- 1918 Sopwith 1½ Strutter
- 1918 Hamble Baby Convert
- 1918 Sopwith Camel
- 1939-1940 Westland Lysander Mk.II
- 1940-1942 Westland Lysander Mk.III
- 1942 Hawker Hurricane Mk.II
- 1942 Hawker Hurricane Mk.IIC
- 1942 North American Mustang Mk.I
- 1942-1943 Hawker Hurricane Mk.IIB
- 1943 Supermarine Spitfire Mk.VB
- 1943 North American Mustang Mk.II
- 1943-1945 Supermarine Spitfire Mk.VC
- 1944-1946 Supermarine Spitfire Mk.IX
- 1960-1962 Bristol Sycamore HC.14
- 1960-1962 Westland Whirlwind HC.2
- 1961-1965 Westland Whirlwind HC.10

== Squadron Codes ==
225 Squadron aircraft wore two different squadron codes during the period 1939-1947.

Code LX was allocated in April 1939 and worn until April 1942.

Code WU was used from April - July 1942, then February 1943 - January 1947.

== Notable members ==
- Leonard E.H. Williams, CBE, DFC, (1919–2007).
- Bob Rogers (SAAF officer) SSA SM MMM DSO DFC & bar (1921-2000)
- Kurt Taussig (1923-2019), Origin from Czechoslovakia, Member 1942-1945
- Stanley Waldman
- Lewis G. Madley (1922-2024) Author of 'A Road Long Traveled'
- Air Commodore Geoffrey Millington, Commanding Officer, 225 Squadron and author of `The Unseen Eye'.

== Surviving aircraft ==
Four aircraft that were operated by 225 Squadron during World War II are known to survive. They are:

- Westland Lysander Mk.III R9125 coded LX-L, RAF Museum, Hendon, London

link: http://www.rafmuseum.org.uk/research/collections/westland-lysander-iii/

This aircraft was used by the Squadron for reconnaissance patrols along the south coast of England between September 1940 and April 1941.

- Westland Lysander V9312 is currently (May 2015) under restoration by the Aircraft Restoration Company (ARC) at Duxford, Cambridgeshire (UK). Built in 1940, it served with 225 Sqn some time between January 1941 and April 1942. Following damage in an accident (whilst being used by 4 Sqn), it was repaired and converted to target tug status before being sent to Canada. It last flew in December 1944.

Link: http://www.arc-duxford.co.uk/restorations/

- Supermarine Spitfire Mk.IX EN 199, operated by 225 Squadron in Italy during World War II, was restored in the 1990s and is now on static display at the Malta Aviation Museum.

Link: https://web.archive.org/web/20140902005253/http://www.maltaviationmuseum.com/spitfire.asp This Spitfire was photographed at Florence, Italy wearing the code WU-S.

- Supermarine Spitfire Mk.IXc PV270 was flown on Army Co-operation missions by 225 Squadron during March–April 1945. It was restored to flying condition over 8 years by a team led by Brendon Deere (nephew of the well-known Alan Deere) in New Zealand. The first post-restoration flight was on 18 March 2009. This aircraft currently resides at RNZAF Ohakea airbase and may be seen flying at displays in New Zealand. [link:

http://www.spitfirepv270.co.nz/
