= Marie-Jeanne Bozzi =

Corsican local politician and convicted criminal (1955-2011)

Marie-Jeanne Bozzi (née Michelosi; 24 June 1955 – 21 April 2011) was a Corsican local politician and convicted criminal who was assassinated in 2011.

== Early life ==
Born as Marie-Jeanne Michelosi on 24 June 1955 in Albitreccia, Corse-du-Sud, she married Antoine Bozzi and used his surname professionally.

== Career ==
Marie-Jeanne Bozzi was elected Mayor of the Corsican commune of Grosseto-Prugna-Porticcio in 2001, but was forced to resign from her post in 2002 when she was convicted of running a prostitution ring; prosecutors alleged that she was madam of the Pussy Cat bar which her brother Jean-Toussaint Michelosi owned, and the César Palace nightclub which was owned by her husband. She received a suspended prison sentence. Despite this conviction, she was re-elected mayor in 2005 with 75% of the vote, but was forced to resign again in 2008 after being convicted of tax fraud. Bozzi successfully supported her daughter, Valérie's, campaign to be elected mayor in her place.

At approximately 16:10 local time on 21 April 2011, two unknown men shot Bozzi eight times as she returned to her car which was parked outside a shopping centre in Porticcio; she died at the scene. Although the killers remained unknown as of 2012, Yves Bordenave writing for the French newspaper Le Monde reported that the killing marked the first time that an elected female politician had been assassinated in Corsica, and suspected that the death was a règlement de compte (translated as score-settling).

Bozzi's murder has been linked to in-fighting within the Southern Corsican mafia following the death of its head, Jean-Jérôme Colonna, known as Jean Jé, in 2006. Bozzi's brother, Ange-Marie Michelosi, was one of Colonna's friends and was murdered in 2008; Bozzi and other members of her clan believed Alain Orsoni (a former nationalist militant who had returned from self-imposed exile in South America) was responsible and suspected him of vying to succeed Colonna. The police intervened and secured a short-lived truce, but in 2009 another Bozzi family associate, Thierry Castola, was murdered and the truce fell apart. The police intervened once more: Bozzi, her husband and her brother Jean-Toussaint were arrested, although Bozzi herself was soon released; Orsoni was also arrested on suspicion of Castola's murder, but released after 10 months in prison. According to Charles Lambroschini writing in The New York Times, "[Bozzi's] death was a vengeful response to her suspected involvement in a gang war that has rocked Corsica since 2006".
