= Bryan Bozzi =

Formula One Race Engineer

- Born: September 27, 1989 (age 36)
- Education: University of Bath
- Occupation: Engineer
- Years active: 2012–present
- Employer: Scuderia Ferrari
- Known for: Race engineer
- Title: Race engineer for Charles Leclerc

Bryan Bozzi (born 27 September 1989) is an Italian-Danish Formula One race engineer. He has been part of the Scuderia Ferrari team for over a decade. He was previously performance engineer for Charles Leclerc, and now is his race engineer.

== Personal life ==
He attended St. George's British International School in Rome, Italy. Later, he moved abroad to England and studied mechanical engineering at the University of Bath, where he received an honors degree. During his time at university, he participated in several Formula One student programs, which ignited his interest in racing. He is fluent in English and Italian.

== Career ==
Bozzi applied for an internship at Ferrari which turned into a full-time position. Joining Ferrari in June 2012, his first role was as a Wind Tunnel Research & Development engineer. In December 2014, he was promoted to Aero Track Group Engineer until November 2018. After these roles, he fulfilled his dream of becoming a racing engineer for Scuderia Ferrari. Bozzi worked as Charles Leclerc's performance engineer since the driver's debut with Ferrari in 2019. At the 2024 Emilia Romagna Grand Prix, he was promoted to Leclerc's race engineer, replacing Xavi Marcos.

Bozzi helped achieve a historical victory at the 2024 Monaco Grand Prix. Team Principal Fred Vasseur praised him for being "direct and decisive".
