= Xavier Marcos Padros =

Spanish engineer

- Occupation: Engineer
- Employer: Cadillac Formula 1 Team
- Known for: Formula One engineer
- Title: Chief Race Engineer

Xavier "Xavi" Marcos Padros is a Spanish Formula One chief race engineer for Cadillac Formula 1 Team. He previously worked at Scuderia Ferrari, as race engineer for Charles Leclerc from 2019 to May 2024.

== Career ==
Marcos Padros started his career in motorsport as a race engineer for the BNC Racing Team. He got his first taste of Formula One while working for the fledging HRT team as performance engineer from 2010–2012. After the team folded he joined Williams Racing as a performance engineer for Felipe Massa. Seeking a new challenge, Marcos Padros decided to move to the United States to become chief race engineer for the NASCAR team Richard Childress Racing in 2015. Marcos Padros returned to Formula One with Scuderia Ferrari, first as a factory based race engineer for 2018 and then became the race engineer for Charles Leclerc when he joined the team in 2019 remaining with the Monegasque until 2024 with the Miami Grand Prix being his last race with Charles. In May 2024, Scuderia Ferrari announced that Xavier Marcos Padros would be replaced by Bryan Bozzi as the race engineer for Charles Leclerc starting In Imola.

In January 2025, after seven years at Ferrari, it was announced that Marcos had been hired by Cadillac as the new technical director of its Cadillac V-Series.R program, which covers the World Endurance Championship (WEC) and the IMSA SportsCar Championship.

In November 2025, it was revealed that Marcos had joined the Cadillac Formula 1 Team as chief race engineer.
