= Paolo Brozzi =

Italian painter

Paolo Brozzi (17th century) was an Italian painter, born and trained in Bologna, and active painting quadrature in Genoa and Rome in the second half of the 17th century.
