= David Padrós =

Catalan composer

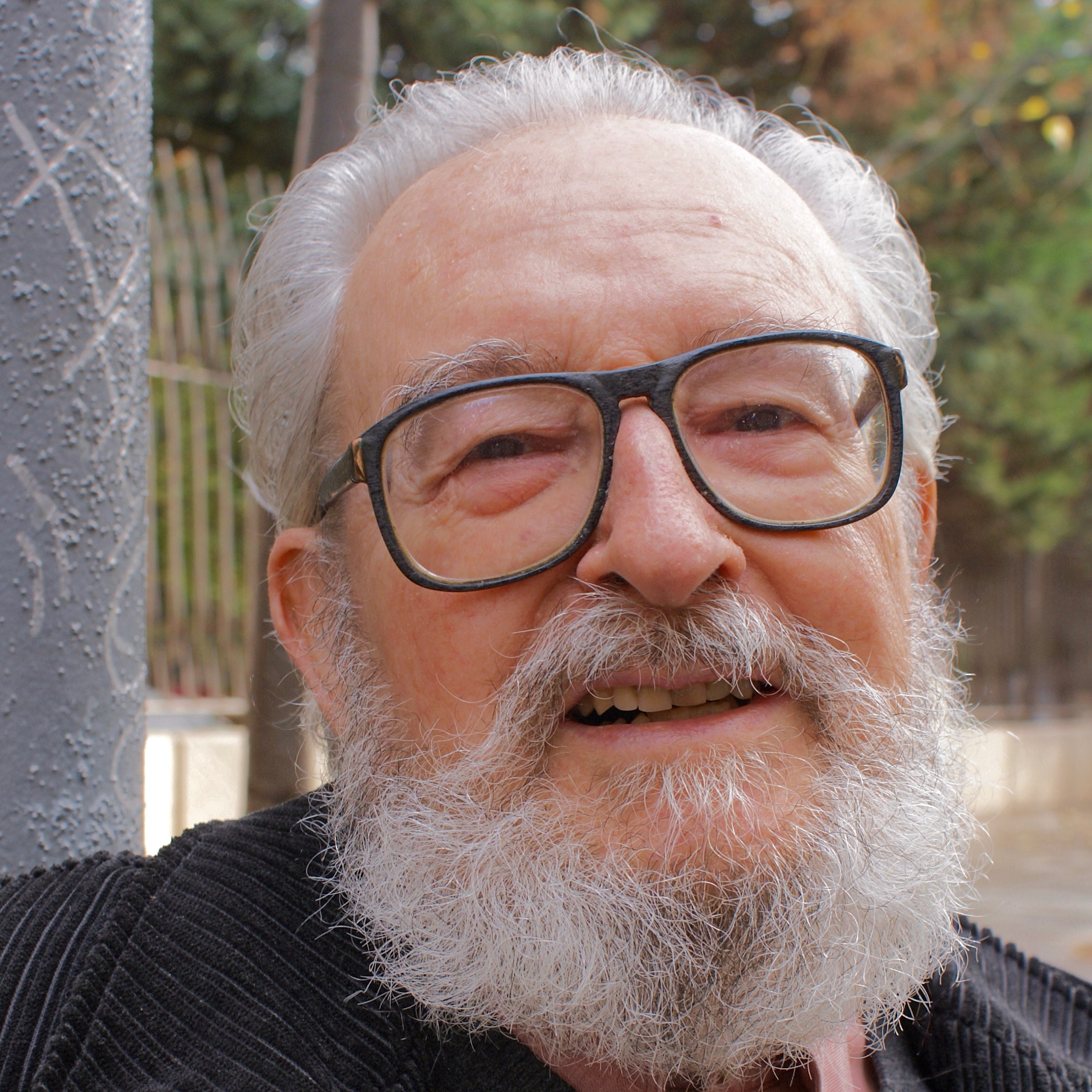
David Padrós

David Padrós (1942–2016) was a Catalan composer.

== Biography ==
He was born in Igualada, Spain in 1942. He studied with Jordi Albareda (piano) and Jordi Torra (harmony and composition). Afterwards he travelled to Germany and Switzerland where he studied with Paul Baumgartner, Sava Savoff (piano), Hans Ulrich Lehman, Klaus Huber (Composition) and Jürg Wyttenbach (contemporary music performance). In 1969 he won the Hanz Lenz prize for the artistic merit (Germany) and the composition prize of the Landis & Gyr Foundation (1976). He lived in Basel until 1982, where he developed an intens task as a composer, pianist and pedagogue. He moved to Barcelona, where he continues with the same professional activities.

In 1971 his work "Styx" was performed for the first time in the Barcelona Music Festival. From that date on, his works have been performed in many European International festivals: In Luzern (Switzerland), the "Gaudeamus Muziekweek" (the Netherlands), "Europalia-85" (Belgium) and Barcelona (1987) where his work "Confluències (Música per a Santa Maria del Mar)" was performed for the first time with a great success. Important to be mentioned are the performances of his works: "Metamorfosis mozartiana" by the Grupo Enigma" in the Auditorio de Zaragoza (2006), "Daha", by Harry Sparnaay in the Ateneu Barcelonès (2006) and "Línies i Plans" by the OBC in the Auditori de Barcelona (2007).

The personal papers of David Padrós are preserved in the Biblioteca de Catalunya.

== Works ==
- "Interludi", (2010). Chamber ensemble
- "Sincronías", (2010). Chamber orchestra
- "Abstracció 3", (2009). Guitarra
- "Abstracció 2", (2009). Clarinet
- "Eclíptica", (2008). Clarinet and violoncello. Edition Tritó
- "Abstracció 1", (2008). Shakuhachi flute
- "Línies i plans", (2006). Orchestra. Edition Tritó
- "Derivacions", (2006). Vibraphone
- "Daha", (2006). Bass clarinet
- "Metamorfosis mozartiana", (2005). Chamber orchestra. Edition Tritó
- "Instants", (2004). Piano. Edition:Tritó
- "Amalgames", (2004). Clarinet, piano
- "Diario de noche", (2003). Piano
- "Lignes dans l'espace", (2003). Flute in G
- "Acciones y reacciones", (2002). Flute, piano. Edition: Universidad de Alcalá
- "Concierto para piano y orquesta", (2002)
- "2 Cançons populars catalanes", (2001). Mixed Chorus (four voices). Edition: Clivis
- "3 Poemas Sonoros", (2001). Mixed Chorus (four voices)
- "El temps segons Rama", (2001). Orchestra
- "Projeccions", (2001). Chamber orchestra
- "Degung", (2000). Recorder, vibraphone
- "Verwandlung", (1999). Flute quartet. Edition: Tritó
- "El Mascarón y su vihuela", (1998). Violin, violoncello, guitar
- "Cheops", (1997). Chamber orchestra
- "Sunyata", (1997). Flute, guitar
- "5 Tankas", (1996). Mezzo-soprano, flute, clarinete, guitar
- "Dialog", (1996). 2 guitars
- "Fragment", (1996). String quartet
- "Manas", (1996). Piano, wind quintet, percussion
- "Ressonàncies", (1995). Piano. Edition: Boileau (Colien Honegger)
- "17 cançons populars catalanes", (1994). Piano. Edition: Clivis
- "Klagelied", (1994). Piano
- "Qawwali", (1994). Recorder quartet
- "Xucla el silenci nocturn", (1994). Violin, violoncello, flute, clarinet
- "Ghiza-I-Ruh", (1993). Flute, clarinet, piano
- "Gjatams", (1993). Piano quartet
- "Sis Diferències (sobre un tema popular mallorquí), (1993). Organ. Edition: Tritó
- "Jdeb", (1992). Recorder quartet
- "Nocturne", (1992). Flute, clarinet, viola
- "La Sala de la Suprema Harmonia", (1991). Instrumental ensemble
- "Recordant a W.A. Mozart", (1991). Clarinet, organ
- "El sermó de Muntaner", (1990). Vocal quartet, 4 wind instruments, organ
- "Ketjak", (1990). 4 pianists at 2 pianos
- "Chaconne", (1989). String quartet, cembalo
- "Reflexe", (1989). Violin, piano. Edition: Clivis
- "Skizze", (1988). Violin, piano. Edition: Clivis
- "Trajectòries", (1986). Guitar. Edition: Clivis
- "Confluències", (1985).8 brass instruments, percussion, electronic
- "Maqam", (1985). Piano. Edition: Clivis
- "Arachne", (1984). Chamber ensemble
- "Cal.ligrama II", (1984). Flute, cembalo
- "6 Cançons populars catalanes", (1993). Mixed chorus (four voices). Edition: Clivis
- "Jo-Ha-Kyu", (1983). Orchestra
- "Musik im Raum", (1979). 2 pianos, flute, oboe, clarinet, percussion
- "Batalla", (1977). Piano, cembalo y 12 strings
- "Deux legendes", (1976). Organ. Edition: Clivis
- "Cal.ligrama I",(1974). Flute in G, piano. Edition: Clivis
- "Materials", (1974). Wind quintet
- "Khorva", (1973). Orchestra
- "Crna Gora", (1972). Bariton, flute, viola, percussion
- "Heptagonal", (1971). Piano
- "Segments", (1971). Flute
- "Styx", (1971). Chamber ensemble. Edition: Breitkopf & Hartel Wiesbaden
- "Binari", (1970). String quartet
- "3 Impromptus", (1968). Piano
- "2 Canciones", (1967). Sopran, piano
