= Graham Beale =

British businessman

Graham John Beale CBE (born 19 October 1958) and former Chief executive of the Nationwide Building Society.

== Early life ==
Beale's father was a former coal miner, who became a maintenance engineer at British Steel and his mother was a nurse. He has a brother, and grew up in Scunthorpe.

== Education and training ==
He attended the High Ridge School in Scunthorpe, which had been Scunthorpe Grammar School two years earlier.

After the John Leggott College from 1975-77, Beale went to Leicester University to read psychology. He said, "I was interested in marketing and advertising and thought psychology would take me in the right direction".

However, he began training as an accountant at Thomson McLintock, now part of KPMG. Thomson McLintock's biggest client was Leicester Building Society (which merged with Alliance in 1987 to form Alliance & Leicester and then acquired by Santander in 2010) and gave Beale an insight into mutuals. He said, "My time at Leicester was quite influential. I liked what mutuals stood for".

== Career ==
Beale joined Anglia Building Society in 1985, as a chartered accountant in the internal audit function.

Anglia Building Society merged with Nationwide Building Society in 1987. At Nationwide Building Society, he was involved in a number of major transactions, including the buying and selling of subsidiary businesses. This included the sale of Nationwide Estate Agents in 1994 and the acquisition of UCB Home Loans in 1995.

Beale was appointed managing director of a Glasgow subsidiary in 1997.

In 2002, he became divisional director, commercial and then joined the board in 2003 as group finance director. He was appointed chief executive on 1 April 2007. In his first year as chief executive, Beale oversaw the merger of the Portman Building Society – the largest merger the mutual sector had ever seen.

During the financial crisis, Beale oversaw mergers with three smaller building societies; the Derbyshire Building Society and Cheshire Building Society in 2008 and the Dunfermline Building Society in 2009. In 2012, plans were announced to integrate these three brand names into one 'Nationwide' brand.

His total pay and benefits during the year 2010 was £1.88 million. By 2012 this had risen to £2.25 million despite faltering performance, leading to criticism from The Guardian, and subsequently in both the Daily Mail's This is Money and The Huffington Post.

Beale has been a member of the FCA Practitioner Panel – representing building societies – since 1 August 2011. He was appointed chairman of the FCA Practitioner Panel from 1 April 2013.

He was appointed Commander of the Order of the British Empire (CBE) in the 2016 New Year Honours for services to the financial services sector.

On 22 May 2015, it was announced that Beale intended to retire as CEO of Nationwide. He stepped down as chief executive on 4 April 2016. Joe Garner, formerly CEO of Openreach, joined the Society as chief executive on 5 April 2016.

== Personal life ==
Beale met his wife at the university at Leicester and married her on graduating; they have two children. He lives in the Vale of White Horse.
