= One Union of Regional Staff =

Former trade union of the United Kingdom

OURS
- One Union of Regional Staff
- Merged into: Nationwide Group Staff Union
- Founded: 2010
- Dissolved: 1 September 2011
- Headquarters: Mold, Flintshire
- Location: Wales
- Key people: Karen Hughes, Chair
- Affiliations: TUC, Alliance for Finance

One Union of Regional Staff (OURS) was a trade union in the United Kingdom.

The union was formed in early 2010 by the merger of the Derbyshire Group Staff Union and the Cheshire Group Staff Union. It organized former Derbyshire Building Society and Cheshire Building Society workers now employed by the Nationwide Building Society and was affiliated to the Trades Union Congress.

The members of OURS voted to merge with the Nationwide Group Staff Union, and this process was completed on 1 September 2011.
