= Nationwide Group Staff Union =

British trade union

NGSU
- Nationwide Group Staff Union
- Headquarters: Banbury, England
- Location: United Kingdom
- Members: ▼12,361 (2024)
- General Secretary: Emma Clay
- Affiliations: TUC; STUC; Unions 21; A4F; War on Want; Amnesty International, Justice For Colombia
- Website: ngsu.org.uk

The Nationwide Group Staff Union (NGSU) is an independent trade union in the United Kingdom which represents workers within the Nationwide Building Society and its associated companies. As of December 2021, it had 12,000 members.

The NGSU was formed in 1990 by the merger of Anglia Building Society Staff Association and Nationwide Building Society Staff Association. The Portman Group Staff Association (PGSA) transferred engagements to NGSU in 2008. It is affiliated to the Trades Union Congress.

The union absorbed the Staff Union Dunfermline Building Society on 1 January 2011, and One Union of Regional Staff on 1 September.
