= Debbie Crosbie =

British banker (born 1970)

Dame Debbie Crosbie DBE
- Born: 30 March 1970 (age 56); Glasgow, Scotland
- Education: University of Strathclyde
- Occupation: Banker
- Title: CEO, Nationwide Building Society
- Term: June 2022–
- Predecessor: Joe Garner
- Children: 1

Dame Deborah Anne Crosbie DBE (born 30 March 1970) is a British banker who has been the chief executive of the Nationwide Building Society since June 2022. She was previously the CEO of TSB Bank from May 2019.

== Early life ==
Crosbie was born and raised in Glasgow, the daughter of an engineer father and a social care manager mother. She attended Boclair Academy and studied international relations as a bachelor's degree at the University of Strathclyde, graduating in 1991.

== Career ==
Crosbie started her career in the Prudential graduate training programme, working in the City of London.

In 1997, she joined Clydesdale Bank as a project manager, rising to chief operating officer (COO) in January 2015.

In November 2018, TSB Bank announced Crosbie as its new CEO, to succeed Paul Pester in May 2019.

In June 2022, she succeeded Joe Garner, as chief executive of the Nationwide Building Society.

In 2025, after overseeing the merger with Virgin Money and declaring Nationwide's 'record breaking' £2.8bn annual return, she was described by The Independent, as Britain's "most successful woman banker." Crosbie's subsequent increase in remuneration was controversial, as the mutual did not allow members a 'binding' vote on this decision.

In December 2025, Nationwide was fined £44 million by the Financial Conduct Authority for having weak financial crime controls and missing opportunities to identify fraudulent Covid furlough payments. One customer had been able to use a personal current account to receive £27.3 million of fraudulent furlough payments over 13 months, £26 million of that in only eight days.

In late 2025, Crosbie was appointed Woman in Finance Champion in the United Kingdom, a nomination announced by the Chancellor of the Exchequer in December 2025. The role, an unpaid ministerial appointment that she has held since 1 January 2026, aims to accelerate the advancement of women into senior leadership positions within the financial sector. She succeeded Dame Amanda Blanc, former CEO of Aviva.

== Honours ==
Crosbie was made a Dame of the British Empire for services to financial services in the King's birthday honours 2025.

== Personal life ==
Crosbie is married and has a daughter.
