= UCB Home Loans =

UCB Home Loans Corporation Ltd (from Union de Crédit pour le Bâtiment) is a subsidiary of the British Nationwide Building Society that was a specialist mortgage lender, working primarily through regulated intermediaries, until 2008. UCBHL operated out of a single location in Sutton with over 300 employees, relocating to Bournemouth and merging with the Portman Building Society's The Mortgage Works in 2007 following Nationwide's merger with the Portman.

It ceased new lending on 31 October 2008, but continues to collect money from its customers.
