= Lord Prior =

Lord Prior may refer to:

- Jim Prior, Baron Prior (1927–2016), British politician and peer
- David Prior, Baron Prior of Brampton (born 1954), British peer, son of Jim Prior, Baron Prior

== See also ==
- Grand Prior, sometimes known as Lords Prior
