= St Lawrence Academy, Scunthorpe =

The Lawrence Academy

Location
- Doncaster Road; Scunthorpe, North Lincolnshire, DN15 7DF; England; 53.59094°N 0.66517°W

Information
- Type: Academy
- Religious affiliation: Church of England
- Department for Education URN: 135674 Tables
- Ofsted: Reports
- Head teacher: Dan Ellerby
- Gender: Coeducational
- Age: 11 to 16
- Enrolment: 807 students
- Website: http://tsla.co.uk

The St Lawrence Academy (formerly High Ridge School) is a coeducational Church of England secondary school with academy status, in Scunthorpe, North Lincolnshire, England. The academy teaches GCSEs and BTECs, and has specialisms in sports and science.

== History ==
=== Grammar school ===
Scunthorpe Grammar School opened in 1927.

A 34 year old senior English teacher, Mr Caine, killed himself, possibly accidentally, on 7 July 1964, being found by policeman James Martin.

32 year old history teacher Geoffrey Stevenson was the Liberal candidate for Gainsborough in the 1966 general election, gaining around 6,000 votes.

It became a comprehensive, as High Ridge School, in 1968 when the Scunthorpe division of Lindsey turned comprehensive. The school lost its sixth form in 1968.

=== Comprehensive ===
In August 1971 ten swimmers from the comprehensive school attempted a relay crossing of the English Channel.

Technical staff, who were educated at the former Scunthorpe Grammar school, were killed in the notorious Flixborough explosion in June 1974, such as 27 year old Michael Skelton.

A community school administered by North Lincolnshire Council, High Ridge School converted to academy status on 1 September 2008 and was renamed The St Lawrence Academy. The school is sponsored by the Church of England Diocese of Lincoln.

In 2011 demolition of the old building began and construction started as part of the Building Schools for the Future programme. The new building was built by May Gurney and was completed in October 2013. The old hall is refurbished but still remains.

== Headteachers ==
=== Scunthorpe Grammar School ===
- John McIver from c. 1950 to 1968

=== High Ridge School ===
- Gerald Derek Fish, until around 1984, he lived at Scotter, and he taught at Westcliffe Secondary Modern School in the 1950s
- Mrs Ann Marsh-Edwards, from November 1984; in March 1996 she was diagnosed with ovarian cancer and died aged 53 on 15 November 1997
- Eric Barker, from March 1996, the former deputy head, he retired at the end of May 1998 after 30 years at the school
- Karen Parsonage, from September 1998 until July 2008, the former deputy head, and a squash player, from Scotter and an English teacher, she had previously taught at the Havelock Comprehensive in Grimsby

== Notable alumni ==
=== High Ridge School ===
- Graham Beale CBE, Chief Executive from 2007 to 2015 of the Nationwide Building Society (attended the John Leggott College), from 1970 to 1975
- Neil Cox, former Premier League footballer

=== Scunthorpe Grammar School ===
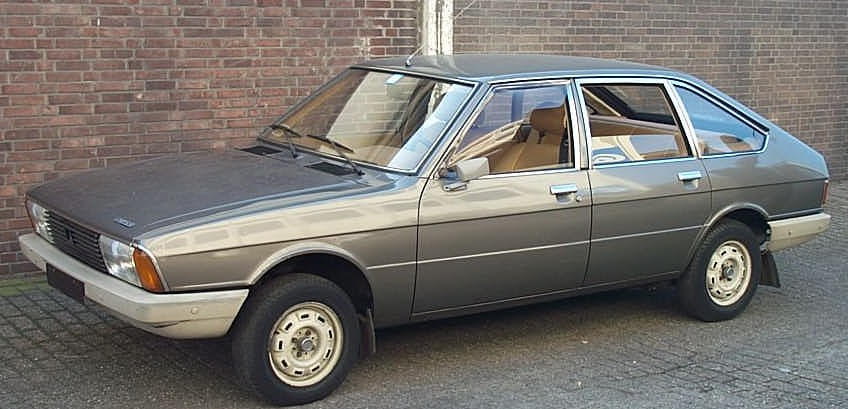
1970s Chrysler Alpine designed by Roy Axe

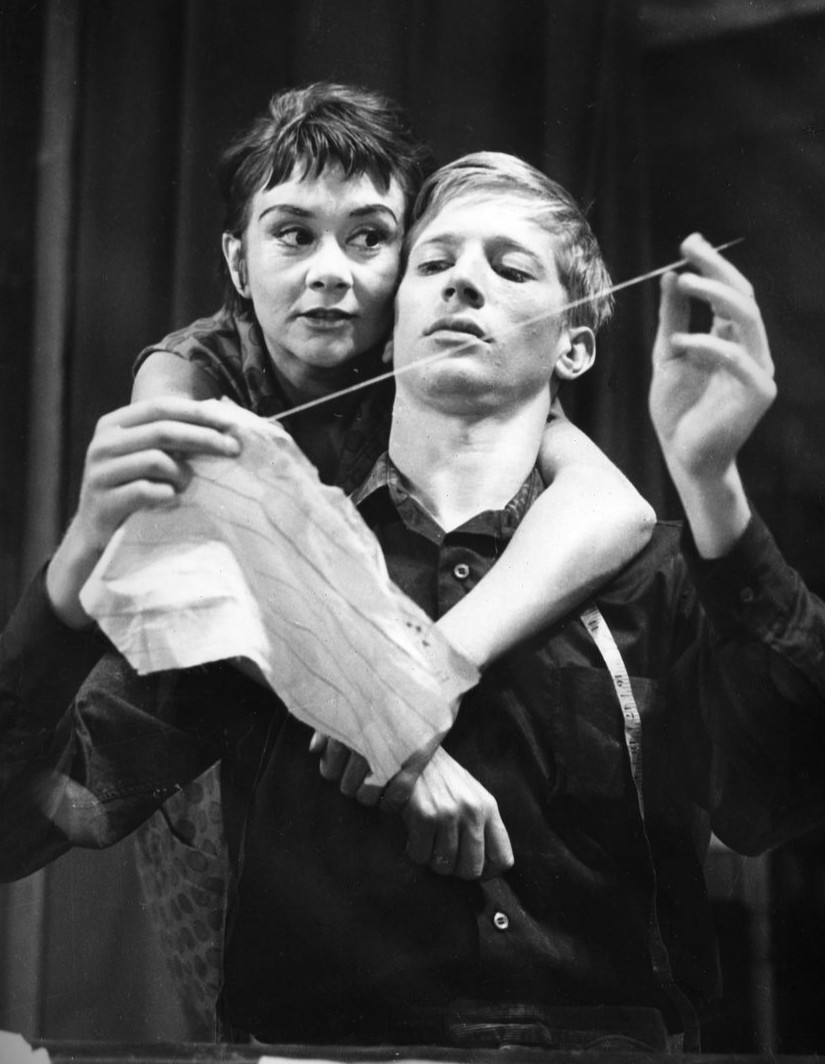
A Taste of Honey performed on stage by Joan Plowright, with Andrew Ray, in 1960

- Roy Axe, car designer with Chrysler Europe in the 1970s, designing the Talbot Horizon and Alpine, later working for Austin Rover Group in the late 1980s
- Prof Gordon Dougan FRS, Head of Pathogen Research at the Wellcome Trust Sanger Institute in Cambridgeshire
- John Peck (politician), can be seen in the film Saturday Night and Sunday Morning, who belonged to the Communist Party of Great Britain (CPGB)
- David Plowright, CBE, television producer, younger brother of Joan, Controller of Programmes from 1969 to 1979 at Granada Television (which helped his brother-in-law)
- Dame Joan Plowright, actress, married to Laurence Olivier from 1961 to his death in July 1989
- Major-General Dennis Shaw CB CBE, Head from 1975 to 1978 of the Commando Logistic Regiment
- Graham Taylor OBE, former manager from 1990 to 1993 of England
- Prof Stephen Westaby FRCS, Senior Cardiac Surgeon since 1986 at the John Radcliffe Hospital, and Professor of Biomedical Sciences since 2006 at the University of Wales
