= Ramsbury Building Society =

Local society in England

- Formerly: Provident Union Building and Investment Society
- Company type: Building society
- Industry: Financial services
- Founded: 1846
- Defunct: 1990
- Fate: Merged
- Successor: Portman Building Society
- Headquarters: Ramsbury, Wiltshire, United Kingdom
- Area served: Wiltshire
- Products: Mortgages, Savings accounts
- Owner: Its members

The Ramsbury Building Society was a British building society that operated in Wiltshire and neighbouring areas from 1846 until it was merged in 1990.

The Ramsbury building society remained a very local society from its founding in 1846 until the 1950s. It then began to expand through agencies, and then in the 1960s opened some twenty branches in Wiltshire and neighbouring areas. Mergers in the 1980s led to name changes, first to the West of England Building Society and then the Regency and West of England Building Society. The Society merged with the Portman Building Society in 1990.

== History ==
=== 1846–1981 ===
The Society was launched in 1846 as the Provident Union Building and Investment Society, Ramsbury, based as its name suggests in the small Wiltshire village of Ramsbury. It was formed as a terminating society (i.e. a society which was planned to be wound up after all the existing members had been enabled to purchase their residential property) but differed from most of these in that new members were accepted without having to pay to catch up with existing members, and that it allowed borrowing. These were characteristics of a permanent building society, and it became such in 1850. There is no information on who promoted the Society, but the trustees and directors were local businessmen with strong nonconformist connections. The Ramsbury remained a very local society for the next hundred years, and at the start of World War I in 1914 the assets were only £54,000. In discussing the inter-war period, the official history reported that there was "no apparent real desire or conscious effort to expand its operations", although there was a reference to agents in Reading in 1933 and Oxford in 1939. The expansion of the private housing market combined with inflation took assets over £1m after World War II, and from then the Ramsbury began to grow. It bought its own offices in 1952, and in 1954 it started advertising and gradually increased its geographic coverage. By 1958 there were agencies in Reading, Devizes, Chippenham, Weston-super-Mare and Wokingham.

1958 was also the year in which F.J.C. Pole was appointed chairman, pursuing a "policy of controlled and significant growth". Between 1958 and 1970 the number of accounts increased from 4,759 to 25,173 and assets from £2.5m to £17m. By the end of the 1960s branches had been opened at Marlborough (1960), Swindon (1961), Newbury and Chippenham (1963), Andover (1966), Trowbridge (1967), and Salisbury and Devizes in 1970. A branch in Swanage came through the acquisition of the Swanage and Isle of Purbeck Building Society 1969 (with assets of £589,000). Branch expansion continued in the 1970s and thirteen new offices had been opened by 1981, with a further ten new agencies. Two very small building societies had also been acquired at the end of the 1970s: the Wilts and Western Benefit Building Society (assets £65,000) and St Martin's-le-Grand Building Society (assets £109,000). The Ramsbury's official history ends at this point: 1981 saw the foundation stone laid for a new headquarters in the larger town of Marlborough; assets stood at £106m and the branch network at 22.

=== Post 1981 ===
The Building Societies Association list of mergers shows a series of amalgamations, each followed by a change in name; it was not always clear which was the dominant partner. The first merger was a transfer of engagements from the Western Counties Building Society in 1985. The Western Counties was based in Bideford, Devon, and it must have been of reasonable size as the Ramsbury was renamed the West of England Building Society. In 1989 there was a transfer of engagements to West of England from the Regency Building Society, based at Hove, Sussex; the enlarged society was then renamed the Regency and West of England Building Society. The following year the Regency and West of England merged with the Portman Building Society. Although the merger was again effected by a transfer of engagements from the Portman to the Regency and West of England, the enlarged entity continued as the Portman Building Society, suggesting that it was the dominant partner. The Portman was eventually acquired by the Nationwide Building Society in 2007.
