= DTZ =

Property company in London, England

- Formerly: Debenham, Tewson & Chinnocks
- Industry: Commercial property
- Founded: 1853
- Defunct: 2015
- Headquarters: London, England
- Area served: Worldwide
- Key people: Tod Lickerman (Chief Executive Officer)
- Number of employees: 47,000 (2014)
- Website: dtzglobal.com at the Wayback Machine (archived 2015-03-26)

DTZ was a London-based commercial property company, which grew via mergers into a multi-national business. The group made major acquisitions just before the 2008 financial crisis which over extended its finances. The Great Recession of 2007-09 left DTZ in serious financial difficulties, and the company went into administration in 2011, which wiped out its equity shareholders. DTZ was then sold to UGL to meet debt obligations, then acquired by Cushman & Wakefield in 2015, who retired the brand.

== History ==
Debenham & Tewson was established in London in 1853. In 1913 it merged with Chinnock, Clarke & Chinnock to form Debenham, Tewson & Chinnocks. In 1987, Debenham, Tewson & Chinnocks was listed on the London Stock Exchange. In 1993, a joint venture was formed with Jean Thouard of France, and the Zadelhoff Group of Germany and the Netherlands, forming DTZ.

Timothy Melville-Ross (previously chair of Nationwide Building Society and director-general of the Institute of Directors) was chairman of the board for a period around 2005.

In December 2011, parent company DTZ Holdings was placed into administration and its business entities were sold to UGL in order to repay £77.5m of an outstanding £106m debt owed to Royal Bank of Scotland. The shareholders' equity was wiped out after a deal with majority shareholder Saint George Participations and BNP Paribas Real Estate fell through. DTZ had slid from being valued at almost £500m around 2006 to insolvency in 2011. The company found itself in difficulty after a poorly-timed spending spree in 2006-2007, buying Rockwood in the US and UK retail agent Donaldsons, left DTZ heavily burdened with debt going into the 2008 financial crisis, which plunged real estate markets globally into a major downturn that lasted years.

In November 2014, DTZ was sold to a consortium of TPG Capital, PAG and the Ontario Teachers' Pension Plan. On 1 September 2015 Cushman & Wakefield completed its takeover of DTZ, and the latter's brand was retired.

DTZ Investors continues as an entity of Cushman & Wakefield and operates as a full-service vertically integrated real estate manager.
