= Colin Morrison =

British publishing executive

Colin Morrison CBE
- Born: 1950 (age 75–76)
- Occupations: Businessman, publishing executive
- Known for: Royal National Children's Foundation chair (2001–2016)

Colin Morrison CBE is a British publishing executive, who is the chairman, non-executive director and consultant of several media and digital companies in the UK, across Europe, the US, and Asia–Pacific. He also publishes the newsletter Flashes & Flames: The Global Media Weekly, which he originally launched as a blog in 2011. As of 2024, he had multiple advisor/ director positions in New York media investment bank JEGI, Anthem, Enthuse Group, Stage Media Company, AA Media, Acclaimworks, Green Star Media, etc.

Morrison was the longest serving chairman of the Royal National Children's Foundation (2001–2016), for his extensive efforts in charity and education he was awarded first awarded an OBE in 2018, and then a CBE in 2024.

== Career ==
Morrison studied at the Royal Wanstead School, a charity-funded boarding school in Essex. Throughout his life, he recalls it with gratitude, convinced that it had provided him with a chance for a successful life which might not be possible due to his complicated family situation. Raised by a single mother, he could not afford to attend university, so immediately after school, in the late 1960s, he began working. His first occupation was a clerical job at the BBC in a newspaper cuttings library. Using their files, he made his first steps as a journalist. Soon, Morrison found a job at Lloyd's List, later he was writing as a freelancer for various publications such as The Sunday Press and Seatrade.

For more than 10 years, Morrison worked at Reed Business Information, successively as publisher, publishing director and deputy chief executive (1979–1991). As he recalls, at that point he shifted out of journalism into publishing and the commercial side of media. Later, he was chair at EMAP Communications (1991–1995). After working at EMAP Plc, in July 1996, Morrison was appointed managing director of the Australian division of Australian Consolidated Press, for several years he moved to Australia, where in 1996–98 chaired also Magazine Publishers of Australia. In 1998, he was appointed to the PBL Board. Morrison returned to London when in 1999 he was appointed Managing Director of the international operations of Axel Springer (1999–2001). In 2001–2003, he was chief operating officer and managing director of Future plc (2001–2003).

Morrison was chairman of SBTV News, a partnership between online platform SBTV and the Press Association (launched with Jamal Edwards), GlobeLinx Networks, Pharmaceutical Press, and also of Great Golf Media.

From 2004 to March 2008, Morrison was chief executive of ACP-Natmag Magazines, a United Kingdom partnership between the National Magazine Company (owned by the Hearst Corporation) and the CVC-owned Australian Consolidated Press and was also CEO of ACP Media UK Ltd. Having established this weekly magazines group and been CEO since its formation four years before, Morrison left after selling ACP's 50% share to Hearst/NatMags.

Later on, Morrison was the chairman of the TV production company GRB Entertainment (2000), Pharmaceutical Press (2001–2013), the British National Formulary (2004–2013), RCN Publishing (2011–2012), Globelynx (2010–2015) (part of the Press Association), and Skips Educational. He has held several non-executive director positions: Centaur Media (2004–2013), IPCN (2008–2013), eQuoteCentral (2009–2010), Travel Weekly Group (2010–2017), Acclaimworks Ltd, Green Star Media Ltd, AA Media Ltd, Enthuse Group Ltd and Anthem Publishing. Morrison was also a consultant to The Stage for 10 years. He has been involved in media partnerships and joint ventures with Sony, Microsoft, the BBC, Hearst, Axel Springer, Dennis, The Washington Post, Press Association and Hachette.

=== Associations and memberships ===
Morrison is a Freeman of the City of London and is liveryman of the Stationers Company, Fellow of the Royal Society of Arts, and Fellow of the Industry Parliament Trust. Morrison is a member of the Cook Society and the Groucho, Savile, RAC and 1920 clubs.

== Awards and accolades ==
In 2016, Morrison was honoured in the Folio:100 in the US. The citation read: "Colin Morrison uses his authoritative and entertaining voice to critique the media industry. He is an insightful and entertaining mind in a wobbly industry, and Flashes & Flames serves as a forceful watchdog."

As a recognition of his work in children's charities and media, Morrison was awarded an OBE in the 2018 New Year Honours. Six years later, he was awarded a CBE in the 2024 New Year Honours.

== Philanthropy ==
Based on his own experience, Morrison understands the impact of education and how it can give a chance for better life to children from underprivileged families. Morrison was the longest-serving chairman in the 189-year history of the Royal National Children's Foundation, of which he was formerly a beneficiary. In this role, during 2001–2016, Morrison campaigned for the government to learn the lessons of the charity's work and what the UK's state and independent boarding schools can do to help transform the life prospects of vulnerable children.

From 2007 to 2011, he was a member of the UK government's Pathfinder group on vulnerable children and, in 2011, was responsible for launching the Assisted Boarding Network, supported by 60% of all local authorities in England and Wales and by the Department for Education This directly led to his launch of Boarding School Partnerships for the Department for Education in 2017, an information service launched by the UK Department for Education under John Nash, the under secretary of state for schools. In July 2018, Morrison announced a Partnership Bursaries scheme under which 38 independent boarding schools would offer 40% bursaries to boarders in and on the edge of local authority care.

=== Flashes & Flames ===
In 2011, Morrison started a blog Flashes & Flames on Wordpress. He wrote about media and publishing, sharing insights and analytics based on his extensive experience in this field. It became a weekly subscription newsletter in 2016. https://flashesandflames.com/flashes-flames/ Guest contributors to Flashes & Flames have included Lord Rothermere, Sir Martin Sorrell, John Ridding, Zillah Byng-Thorne and Arnaud de Puyfontaine. In 2020, Morrison transformed Flashes & Flames into a weekly subscription newsletter. In April 2025, Flashes & Flames acquired Media Voices, a digital media company launched in 2016 by Kezia Thorpe, Peter Houston, and Chris Sutcliffe.

In May 2025, Flashes & Flames organised its first live event, the Monetising B2B Information & Events conference at the Stationers' Hall in London. It now organizes three annual events in London: The AI Forum, Monetising B2B, and The MediaVoices Publisher Summit & Awards. www.flashesandflames.com/about
