= Staffordshire Building Society =

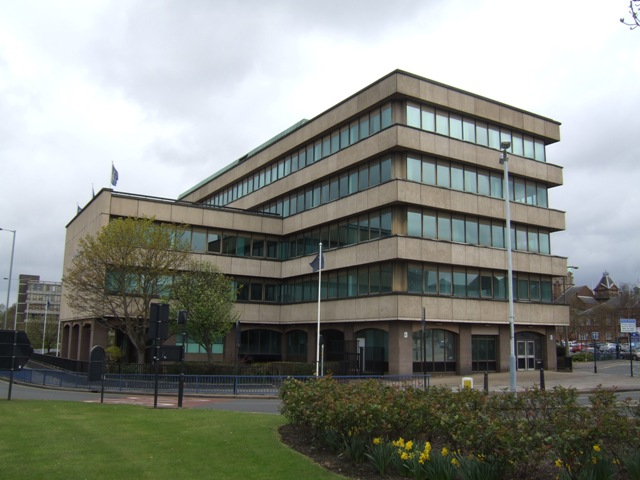
- The former head office in Wolverhampton
- Founded: 1902
- Defunct: 2003
- Fate: Acquired by the Portman Building Society
- Headquarters: Wolverhampton, England

Staffordshire Building Society was a UK building society, which merged with the Portman Building Society in 2003, which then merged with the Nationwide Building Society in 2007.

== History ==
=== The early years ===
For much of its life, the Staffordshire remained a local society run on an almost part-time basis. It was formed as the South Staffordshire Permanent Building Society and opened its doors in February 1902 in Wolverhampton. (The “Permanent” was dropped form the name in 1951 and the “South” in 1975.) The original directors were sundry businessmen and a couple of councilors; two of the directors came from the short-lived Wolverhampton Economic Building Society. Francis Hinde, a local printer, first proposed the creation of the Society (his firm printed the 1977 history) and business commenced at the offices of the Secretary at 5 Princes Street where it stayed for 19 years Early stated objectives were “to help working men who wish to become their own landlords” and” the encouragement of thrift”.

The Secretary who ran the Society on a part time basis was a local insurance broker and estate agent called John Brotherton Annan and he performed that role until his death in 1931. For the whole of John Annan’s tenure, he received a fee for running the Society out of which he provided and paid for the clerks who handled the administration. Other than an agency in nearby Bilston, there was little attempt to expand the society and by the outbreak of World War I assets were no more than £36,000. Perhaps the only event of not during those early years was the involvement with the abortive Fallings Park Garden Suburb. Sir Richard Paget had ambitions to build a garden suburb on 400 acres of land on the Cannock Road. He approached the Staffordshire for help in financing the freeholders and the first houses were finished in 1908. However, Sir Richard died in that year and the project ran out of steam. The estate was never completed and the land was sold by the family in 1916.

=== Consolidation ===
In 1919 the Society admitted to being “painfully small”. There were intermittent amalgamation talks with the Sedgley Building Society; a rejected approach to the Permanent Salopian Balding Society; and occasional proposals to merge the three Wolverhampton building societies. In 1919 John Annan told the directors that his firm had bought premises at 34 Princes Street and the offices were opened in 1921. The Society moved there continuing to use Annan’s staff and paying a rent. In 1922 the Staffordshire bought the building, leaving Annan paying rent but still carrying on the Society’s business. In 1931 the decision was made that the Staffordshire should build its own office but shortly after the decision John Annan died. His brother Alex took over as Secretary, continuing until 1955. Under the old arrangements, John had been paid a fee and had provided all the clerks. Under the new arrangements, nine employees were hired to provide the Society with a more conventional structure.

The interwar period saw steady growth in assets with the one-million-pound mark being reached in 1936. There were still no branches as the Staffordshire concentrated on a conservative agency structure for its modest regional expansion. By 1939 there were 20 agencies, predominantly in the midlands but also west into Shrewsbury and Welshpool. The only exceptions were odd forays such as lending on an estate in Margate in 1928 and in Bristol in 1934.

=== A professional Society ===
The Staffordshire’s history described the years after 1955 as the period of professionalism. Following the retirement of Alex Annan as Secretary, Malcolm Deaville was appointed as the Society’s first full time manager. It still took four years before the Staffordshire decided to open branches albeit only in Wolverhampton and the neighbouring towns: the first branch was opened in Sedgley in 1959. There were also two very small acquisitions in 1959, the Sedgley and District Permanent and the West Midlands with assets of only £0.3m between them. The assets of the Staffordshire were now up to £5.6m. The only significant acquisition came in 1975 when the Stafford and Country Permanent added £7,5m to the Staffordshire’s then £70m. assets. The society relocated from Princess Street to modern offices on the Ring Road in 1977.

The Society’s official history finished in 1977 by which time there were 38 branches in Staffordshire, Shropshire, Worcestershire, west midlands and Clwyd, plus a further 26 agents. Malcolm Deaville was still Managing Director, 22 years after his original appointment, and the Society’s assets, helped by the rise in house prices and an increase in the private housing stock, were £112m. There is little published information after that date. An announcement of a computer contract in 2001 referred to the Staffordshire having 52 branches throughout the Midlands and Wales. In 2003, the Society was acquired by the Portman Building Society.
