= Lambeth Building Society =

- Company type: Building Society (Mutual)
- Industry: Financial services
- Founded: 1852
- Defunct: 2006
- Fate: Merged with the Portman Building Society
- Products: Savings, Mortgages

The Lambeth Building Society was a UK building society. It was founded in February 1852 as The Number Three Borough of Lambeth Permanent Benefit Building Society.

It merged with the Portman Building Society in 2006. At the time of the merger, the Lambeth was the 20th largest building society in the UK, with assets of £1 billion.

Following Portman's merger with Nationwide Building Society, branches adopted the Nationwide name.
