= Joe Garner (businessman) =

- Born: Johnson Daniel Garner; 23 June 1969 (age 57); Hertfordshire, England
- Education: Cambridge University
- Occupation: Financial services
- Years active: 1991 – present
- Known for: Former CEO of HSBC UK, Openreach and Nationwide Building Society
- Board member of: Nationwide Building Society, Financial Services Practitioner Panel
- Children: 1

Johnson Daniel Garner (born 23 June 1969) was the chief executive of Nationwide Building Society, the UK's largest mutual financial organisation, from May 2016 to June 2022. He previously held senior roles at BT's infrastructure division Openreach, HSBC and Procter & Gamble.

== Early life ==
Garner was born in Hertfordshire, having two older sisters. His father was an aeronautical engineer who had worked at de Havilland, and had married Alegra Mizrahi in 1959.

He went to school at King's College School, an independent school in Wimbledon, leaving in 1987. He studied Geography at Magdalene College, Cambridge.

== Career ==
=== Early career ===
Garner was a graduate trainee at Procter & Gamble (P&G) in 1991. He spent nine years at P&G including five years in Romania, then worked at their European headquarters in Brussels. He joined Dixons in 2001, initially as Marketing Director at mobile phone retailer The Link. In 2003 he played a key role in launching Immobilise www.immobilise.com which had the objective of reducing mobile phone theft by stopping the ability to re-programme stolen phones.

=== HSBC ===
Following his stint at P&G and a short stay at Dixons, Garner joined HSBC in 2004. He was appointed Head of UK Retail Bank on 1 December 2010 as Group General Manager and deputy head of HSBC UK, replacing Paul Thurston. He is credited with putting in place the firms approach to Treating Customers Fairly. He left at the end of October 2012. Brian Robertson was Head of HSBC Group's (combined) UK operations at the time.

=== BT ===
Garner became chief executive of BT's infrastructure division Openreach in February 2014. During his tenure superfast broadband coverage exceeded 90%. He left the company in April 2016 to become chief executive of Nationwide Building Society.

=== Nationwide ===
His role at Nationwide started on 5 April 2016, with former CEO Graham Beale stepping down on 4 April 2016. In addition to his £885,000 salary, Garner also receives a £292,000 pension allowance, a £1 million bonus and £500 a day to cover the cost of travel, security and medical expenses. In April 2020, Garner was one of the first CEOs in the financial services sector to take a salary reduction and forfeit his bonus in light of the COVID-19 pandemic. In March 2021 Nationwide said that its 13,000 staff could work anywhere, with Garner describing the move as "putting employees in control of where they work from". On 23 September 2021, Nationwide announced that Garner had asked the Board of the Society to start the process of finding his successor as part of an orderly transition. At Nationwide's half-year results in November 2021, the Society stated that its profits had more than doubled versus the same period last year to £853million.

In May 2022 the Society announced its best ever financial results since it was founded in 1884 when it recorded a profit of £1.6bn for its financial year 2021/2022. In attributing the financial performance of the Society Garner said, "We have stuck to our knitting and have focused on doing it well. The key point is that all of our profit is retained and gives my successor options." Garner was succeeded on 2 June as CEO by Debbie Crosbie, formerly CEO of TSB.

=== Industry roles ===
Garner sat on the board of UK Finance, the trade association for the finance industry, and sat on the Practitioner Panel of the Financial Services Authority having previously been its Chair from 2011 to 2013. He was also a non-executive director of the Financial Ombudsman Service from 2008 to 2010.

On 10 July 2023 in his Mansion House speech, Jeremy Hunt, the Chancellor of the Exchequer announced that Joe Garner would Chair an independent review on the Future of Payments with the objective of considering how payments are likely to be made in the future and to make recommendations on the steps needed to successfully deliver world leading retail payments.

=== Other roles ===
On 5 February 2024 Garner was appointed by the Cabinet Office to the committee responsible for recommending proposals for a permanent memorial and legacy programme to remember Queen Elizabeth II.

== Personal life ==
He is a keen triathlete, competing in his age group at the 2018 European Championships, coming 15th. He was chair of the Triathlon Trust from 2012–2020 and upon leaving became Patron of the British Triathlon Federation, only the second time this honour has been bestowed on an individual.

== See also ==
- Chris Pilling, Chief Executive of the Yorkshire Building Society, who also studied Geography at Cambridge, then took a graduate role with P & G, then worked at HSBC

Business positions
Preceded by Graham Beale	Chief Executive of Nationwide Building Society; April 2016 - June 2022	Succeeded by Debbie Crosbie
Preceded by Liv Garfield	Chief Executive of Openreach; February 2014 - April 2016	Succeeded by Clive Selley
Preceded by Paul Thurston	Head of UK Retail Bank of HSBC UK; December 2010 - October 2012	Succeeded by António Pedro dos Santos Simões
