= Kevin Parry (British businessman) =

British business executive

Kevin Allen Huw Parry OBE
- Born: January 29, 1962 (age 64); United Kingdom
- Citizenship: UK
- Education: Robinson College, Cambridge
- Occupations: Business executive, banker, chartered accountant
- Known for: Former chair of Nationwide Building Society, Virgin Money UK and Clydesdale Bank as well as chair of the Royal National Children's Foundation

Kevin Allen Huw Parry OBE (born 29 January 1962) is a British business executive and Fellow of the Institute of Chartered Accountants in England and Wales. He has chaired Nationwide Building Society since February 2022 and, following Nationwide's 2024 acquisition of Virgin Money UK, was appointed non-executive chair of Virgin Money UK and Clydesdale Bank in September 2025. In January 2026, Nationwide announced that Parry would step down as chair of Nationwide, Virgin Money UK and Clydesdale Bank in July 2026.

He has also been an independent non-executive director of Daily Mail and General Trust since 2014 and served as interim chair of the Homes and Communities Agency between 2015 and 2016.

Parry is active in public and charitable life. He chaired the Royal National Children's Foundation and, following its 2017 merger with the SpringBoard Bursary Foundation, led the combined charity. He was appointed OBE in the 2018 New Year Honours for services to vulnerable children. Since January 2025 he has served as chair of Marie Curie.

== Early life and education ==
Parry was educated at Olchfa Comprehensive in Swansea. He studied management at Robinson College, Cambridge, graduating with a Master of Arts degree.

== Career ==
Parry began his career in auditing and finance, qualifying as a chartered accountant with KPMG in 1986. He was appointed London partner in 1994 and became managing partner in 1998.

After 17 years (1982–1999) at KPMG, Parry joined Proudfoot Consulting (later renamed Management Consulting Group) as chief executive on 31 December 1999. At that time Proudfoot was in decline, with its shares down from 400p in 1991 to 11p. Under his leadership the company recovered, reaching a high of 80p in 2002. He led the group until February 2008.

Parry served on the board of Schroders as a non-executive director before becoming chief financial officer in 2009. He held this position until 2013. In 2009 he also joined the board of Intermediate Capital Group, later serving as its chairman from 2016 until 2019.

In October 2014, Parry joined the board of Standard Life as a non-executive director. He later served as audit committee chair and then senior independent director at Standard Life Aberdeen, stepping down at the end of 2018.

In December 2015 Parry was appointed interim chair of the Homes and Communities Agency, following the departure of Robert Stewart Napier, and was succeeded by Edward Lister in July 2016.

Parry served as chair of the Royal London Group, the UK's largest mutual life, pensions and investment company, from 2019 to 2024. During his tenure Royal London pursued consolidation among mutuals and explored strategic options with several peers, including Liverpool Victoria. In October 2024 Parry announced he would remain until year-end and that a new chair should lead Royal London through the next five-year cycle.

Parry joined the Nationwide Building Society board as an independent non-executive director on 23 May 2016. He became senior independent director in January 2020 and was appointed chair on 1 February 2022. As chairman he led the £2.3 billion acquisition of Virgin Money UK in 2024. In May 2025 Sky News reported that Nationwide had begun the search for Parry's successor as chair. Following the Nationwide–Virgin Money transaction, on 30 September 2025 he was appointed non-executive chair of the boards of Virgin Money UK and Clydesdale Bank. In January 2026, Nationwide announced that Mike Rogers would succeed Parry as chair of Nationwide, Virgin Money and Clydesdale Bank. Parry is due to step down from the board on 15 July 2026.

=== Other non-executive and advisory roles ===
Parry has held a number of other non-executive roles. He has served as an independent non-executive director of Daily Mail and General Trust (from 2014, chairing its audit committee) and as a non-executive director of Knight Frank LLP. He served as Master of the Worshipful Company of Chartered Accountants in England and Wales (the Chartered Accountants' Livery Company) for the 2023–24 year.

== Public and charitable activities ==
Parry has been active in the charity and public sectors. He served as chairman of the Royal National Children's Foundation (RNCF), a boarding‑bursary charity supporting disadvantaged and vulnerable children. In May 2017 RNCF announced a merger of equals with the SpringBoard Bursary Foundation, and Parry became chair of the new charity. In the 2018 New Year Honours he was appointed an Officer of the Order of the British Empire (OBE) "for services to vulnerable children".

Parry is also a supporter of his alma mater's archive. In 2023 the Reading Room of the Robinson College Archive, in the Chandrakala & Mansukhlal Shah Building, was named in his honour. He has served as a trustee of the Chartered Accountants' Livery Charity.

Parry chairs the Mutual and Co-operative Sector Business Council (also described as the Mutuals and Co-operatives Business Council), an industry body established in 2025 to coordinate engagement between major UK mutuals and co-operatives and sector trade bodies. In October 2025 the Council submitted a paper to HM Treasury outlining recommendations to expand the economic contribution of credit unions.

In November 2024 the end‑of‑life charity Marie Curie announced Parry's appointment as chair of its board of trustees with effect from 1 January 2025.
