= Derbyshire Group Staff Union =

Former trade union of the United Kingdom

- Merged into: One Union of Regional Staff
- Founded: 1972
- Dissolved: 2010
- Headquarters: Duffield, Derbyshire
- Location: United Kingdom
- Members: 405 (2009)
- Key people: Sharon Penny, final general secretary
- Affiliations: TUC
- Website: www.dgsu.org.uk

The Derbyshire Group Staff Union was a trade union in the United Kingdom, representing workers at the Derbyshire Building Society.

The union was founded in 1972 as the Derbyshire Building Society Staff Association. In 1979, it applied for a Certificate of Independence, but this was refused. At the time, it had 267 members. It was finally granted a certificate in 1986.

The union affiliated to the Trades Union Congress in 2003 and adopted its final name in 2004. In 2010, it merged with the Cheshire Group Staff Union to form One Union of Regional Staff.
