= The Mortgage Works =

UK business

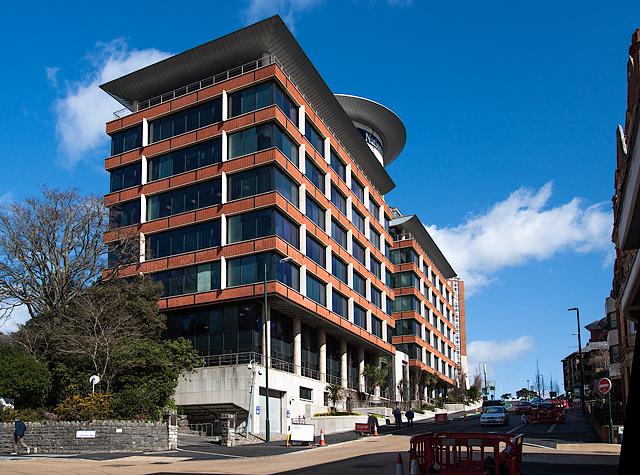
- Office in Bournemouth, UK
- Type: Subsidiary of Nationwide Building Society
- Industry: Mortgage lender
- Founded: 1988
- Headquarters: Bournemouth, England, UK
- Website: www.themortgageworks.co.uk

The Mortgage Works (UK) plc is a specialist Buy to Let mortgage lender of Nationwide Building Society, working primarily through regulated intermediaries and based in Bournemouth, Dorset, England. They specialise in buy to let mortgage finance.

Originally Sun Bank, it was purchased by the Portman Building Society in 2001 and renamed to The Mortgage Works in 2004. When Portman was merged with the Nationwide in 2007 they continued to trade under a separate name as a subsidiary.
