= Timothy Melville-Ross =

British businessman (born 1944)

Sir Timothy David Melville-Ross CBE (born October 1944) is a British businessman who was CEO of Nationwide Building Society from 1985 to 1994 and went on to hold the role of chairman at several major companies, often simultaneously. Before and after his retirement from business he had leading roles in public bodies in areas including education and business ethics.

== Early life ==
Melville-Ross was born in Westward Ho!, Devon, the son of Lt. Anthony Stuart Melville-Ross of the Royal Navy, and Anne Barclay Fane (née Gamble). He was privately educated at Uppingham School, and turned down a place at Cambridge University. He earned a diploma in business studies in 1967 from Portsmouth College of Technology.

== Career ==
After working for BP, Melville-Ross joined Nationwide Building Society as company secretary, where he was CEO from 1985 to 1994. From 1994 to 1999, he was director-general of the Institute of Directors. He was chair of Bovis Homes Group for a time. In 2005, his roles included chairman at estate agents DTZ, maker of London taxis Manganese Bronze, and insurer Royal London.

Away from business, Melville-Ross was chair of Investors in People from 1999 to 2006. He had a fundraising role at the University of Essex and then was chair of the university's governing body from approximately 2002 to 2008. He was chair of the Higher Education Funding Council for England from 2008, and of Homerton University Hospital NHS Foundation Trust from 2013 to 2019. He was president of the advisory council of the Institute of Business Ethics from 2013 to approximately 2023.

== Honours and awards ==
Melville-Ross was appointed a Commander of the Order of the British Empire in the 2005 New Year Honours for services to Workplace Learning and Development. He was a knighted in the 2018 New Year Honours for services to Higher Education.

In 2008, he received an honorary degree from the University of Essex.
