= St. Pancras Building Society =

British building society

- Company type: Building Society (Mutual)
- Industry: Financial services
- Founded: 1944
- Defunct: 1993
- Fate: Acquired by the Portman Building Society
- Products: Savings, Mortgages

St. Pancras Building Society was a UK building society, which was established in January 1944. It merged with the Portman Building Society in 1993.
