= Nationwide International =

- Industry: Offshore finance
- Founded: 1990
- Defunct: 2017
- Headquarters: Douglas, Isle of Man
- Key people: Philip Dunne, Managing Director
- Products: Offshore savings accounts
- Number of employees: 70 (approx.)

Nationwide International was a branch of Nationwide Building Society, based in Douglas on the Isle of Man and licensed in the Isle of Man by the Isle of Man Financial Services Authority. It provided a range of offshore savings accounts denominated in euro, pound sterling and US dollar.

Nationwide International's assets were in excess of £2.76 billion as at 31 March 2008, increasing to £3.69 billion by 31 March 2009, making it one of the largest deposit takers in the Isle of Man.

Nationwide International confirmed in a statement issued on 22 September 2016 that it would be closing in mid-2017 and on 13 February 2017 confirmed all accounts would be closed by 30 June 2017. Local media sources confirmed up to 70 jobs would be lost as a consequence of the closure.
