= Royal National Children's Foundation =

British children's charity

The Royal National Children's Foundation
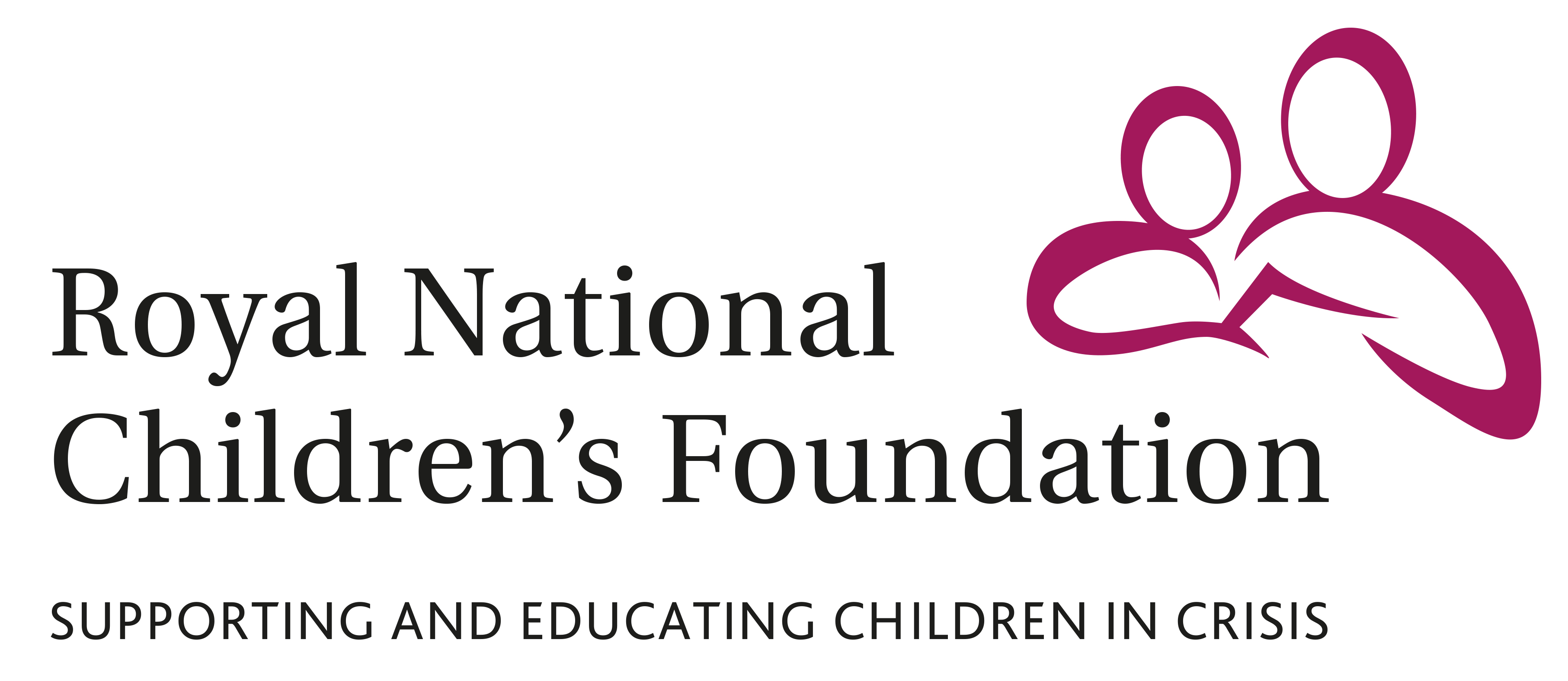
- Formation: 1827
- Founder: Dr Andrew Reed
- Type: Charity
- Purpose: Education for vulnerable children
- Location: 6th Floor, Minster House 42 Mincing Lane London EC3R 7AE
- Key people: Patron: Princess Royal; Chair: Nick Owen (incumbent)
- Website: https://www.royalspringboard.org.uk/
- Formerly called: The Infant Orphan Asylum

The Royal National Children's SpringBoard Foundation (RNCSF) is a British charity which helps vulnerable children by providing them with the opportunity to move into a supported education environment. The organisation dates back to 1827, when it was founded by Dr Andrew Reed in 1827 as the Infant Orphan Asylum.

Through a series of transformations, it continued to operate throughout the 19th and 20th centuries, changing its name several times after merging with other charitable organisations. The charity received its current name in 2017 after merging with the SpringBoard Bursary Foundation. Together, they formed the Royal National Children's SpringBoard Foundation, the UK's leading educational scholarship fund. In addition to paying for school fees, the RNCSF also funds counselling, educational school trips and holidays for children from vulnerable backgrounds.

The RNCSF's Patron is the Princess Royal.

== History ==
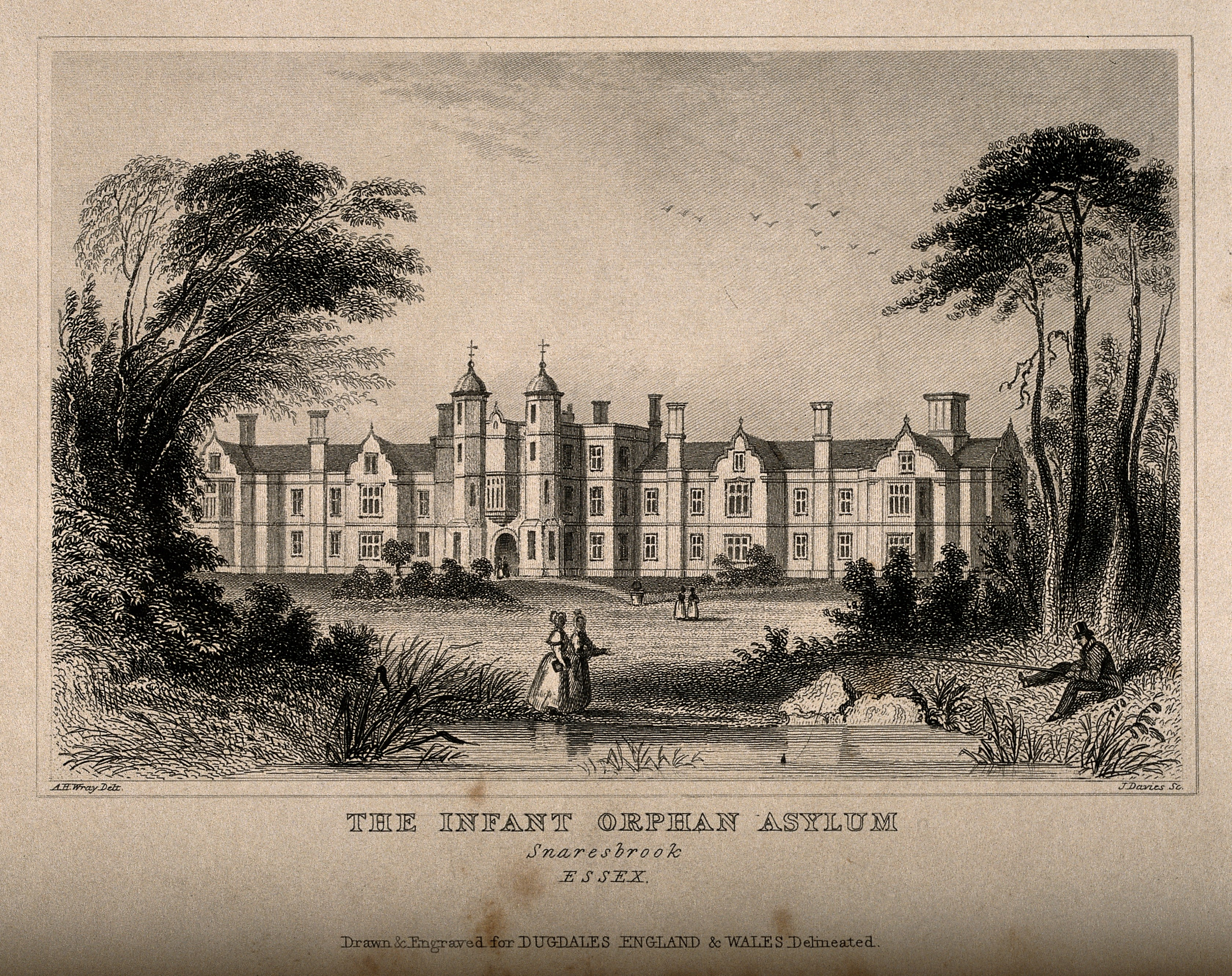
The Infant Orphan Asylum, Snaresbrook, Essex

=== XIX – XX centuries ===
The RNCSF is the successor charity to the Infant Orphan Asylum founded as an orphanage by Dr Andrew Reed in 1827. With the help of the Duke of Wellington, a long-time friend, Reed acquired the piece of land on the edge of Epping Forest. Prince Albert laid the first foundation stone in 1841, Sir Gilbert Scott and William Moffat designed the building. The Infant Orphan Asylum was opened on the 5th of June, 1843, by Leopold, King of the Belgians. The establishment housed 600 children.

In 1842, Queen Victoria became the first Royal Patron of the charity. In 1920, King George V approved the new name: the Royal Infant Orphanage. In 1939 (some sources state, after the World War II), under the patronage of King George VI, the charity was renamed Royal Wanstead School. It was based at Wanstead on the edge of Epping Forest in grand buildings that today house the Snaresbrook Crown Court. The entrance age was raised to seven.

In the mid-1960s, when the cash crisis broke out, local authority funding decreased drastically. In 1971 the Royal Wanstead School was closed with annual losses of £50,000 and pupil numbers down to 211. The charity kept working as the Royal Wanstead Children's Foundation.

=== XXI century ===
The RNCSF supports vulnerable children at a range of boarding schools throughout the United Kingdom. These children who have one or no active parents and have suffered abuse, neglect, fear and disruption in their home, family or school environment such as to be seriously prejudicial to their normal development. The charity funds the schooling of beneficiaries by putting together packages with the support of other charities and the schools themselves. In this way, the RNCSF leverages its own funds some seven times, so that a grant of c.£4,000 can effectively secure the fees for a vulnerable young person at an independent boarding school for a whole year. Coupled with the charity's low administrative costs, this helps ensure that a very large proportion of all donations and legacies go direct to paying fees for beneficiaries.

Between 2001 and July 2016, the RNCF's Chairman was Colin Morrison, a publisher and media executive who was formerly a beneficiary of the charity. Morrison was succeeded by Kevin Parry. In 2012, the RNFC placed 300 7-year old kids in 18 boarding schools. Under Morrison, the RNCF supported more than 2000 young borders across 200 state and independent boarding schools.

A five year long study by the Royal Wanstead Children's Foundation (2004-2009) showed that the 30 young people it helped became 'star performers' in measurements of social, emotional and academic criteria. Morrison stated that “the research shows how so many of these children grasp their golden opportunity with both hands and become star performers by all measures," with students expressing appreciation for the support received.

The RNCF has actively campaigned for the Government to recognise and incentivise the 'vital welfare role' of boarding schools. In modern Britain, the number of boarding school locations has declined by up to 40% in fewer than 25 years. The charity urges local authorities to amplify 'foster boarding' as a solution for the acute shortage of caregivers. The decades-long experience of the RNCF statistically shows that, for many vulnerable children, boarding schools offer the unique, life-changing combination of a safe, supportive environment with many educational opportunities.

In December 2010, the Royal Wanstead Children's Foundation and the Joint Educational Trust (JET) announced merging to form the Royal National Children's Foundation. The JET was founded in the 1970s by a group of prep school head teachers, its first chairman was wartime hero Group Captain Douglas Bader. The JET had been closely collaborating with the RWCF for more than 20 years. The merged charity declared its aim to increase to 500 the number of vulnerable young people supported within five years. The appeal was launched with a dinner in February 2011 hosted by The Princess Royal at Buckingham Palace.

In 2011, Colin Morrison launched the Assisted Boarding Network to promote the effectiveness of Assisted Boarding for vulnerable young people in the care of local authorities. The network, jointly promoted both by the RNCF and Buttle UK, was launched at a Westminster conference in June 2012, addressed by Tim Loughton, the Under Secretary of State for Children & Families and by Lord Adonis, his predecessor in the former Labour government. The conference was attended by representatives from more than 60 local authorities throughout England and Wales. The initiative called for all boarding schools to take 'social' bursaries.

In 2017, the RNCF merged with the SpringBoard Bursary Foundation, an equal charity which supports vulnerable children. The merged charity included 12 trustees, 6 from the RNCF and 6 from SpringBoard. Kevin Parry became chair, Tim Burton of the SpringBoard became deputy chair. The Royal National Children's SpringBoard Foundation became Britain's leading education bursary, funding 670 children and planning to raise the figure to 1000 in two years time.

In 2019, the RNCSF published the results of a five-year study on the benefits of attending supported boarding schools, which examined the experiences of 700 students. The report showed that charity supported boardsters are three times more likely to go to university and six times more likely to achieve at least two A-levels, compared to other students from disadvantaged families across the country. The researchers emphasised that the impressive results were achieved not because the charity selected the most gifted children, but because each child naturally realised their potential in the supportive and safe environment of the boarding school. In 2023, the RNCSF published another study, led by Professor David Murphy, that confirmed the findings of previous studies. It showed that supported boardsters are four times more likely to achieve ‘good’ passes in English and mathematics at GCSE. It also proved financial benefits: for supported boardsters in private schools lower social care costs and increased earning potential equates to around £2.75 mln for every 100 children.

In 2020, the RNCSF was awarded a contract by the Department for Education to deliver the “Broadening Educational Pathways for Looked After & Vulnerable Children” scheme.

In 2021, day schools were included in the RNCSF partner network, and a new educational outreach programme was launched to cover weekends and holidays.

In October 2025, the RNCSF announced partnership with the King Edward VI School.

== Team and structure ==
The RNCSF supports its beneficiaries for either the duration of their secondary schooling or until they no longer need the charity's support. In many cases, the charity supports its beneficiaries for 7–8 years, usually until they reach the age of 18. The charity's invested endowment helps underwrite its commitment and ensures the continuity of schooling and care for young people. The RNCF is funded entirely by voluntary donations. In 2017, the charity reported an annual income of £1.5 mln. As of 2024, the charity reported total income of £3,677,882, with total expenditure of £3,061,170, £2.92 million was spent on charitable activities. In 2013-2021, the charity helped 828 children. By 2024, it was planned to increase the number of beneficiaries to 50 per year.

In late 2016, Geoffrey Dennis stepped down as CEO, succeeded by Ian Davenport, CEO of SpringBoard. Davenport was succeeded by Ali Henderson in March 2020.

Kevin Parry was the Chairman in 2016-2019. After several interim chairs, in June 2022, Nick Owen CBE was appointed chair.

== Literature ==
- Reed, Andrew (1863). Memoirs of the life and philanthropic labours of Andrew Reed. Strahan & Company. p. 543.
- Harrington, Drew (2015). 'O' is for Orphan and Optimist. Troubador Publishing Ltd. p. 8-9. ISBN 9781784622572.
