= David Prior, Baron Prior of Brampton =

Former chairman of NHS England and life peer

The Right Honourable The Lord Prior of Brampton
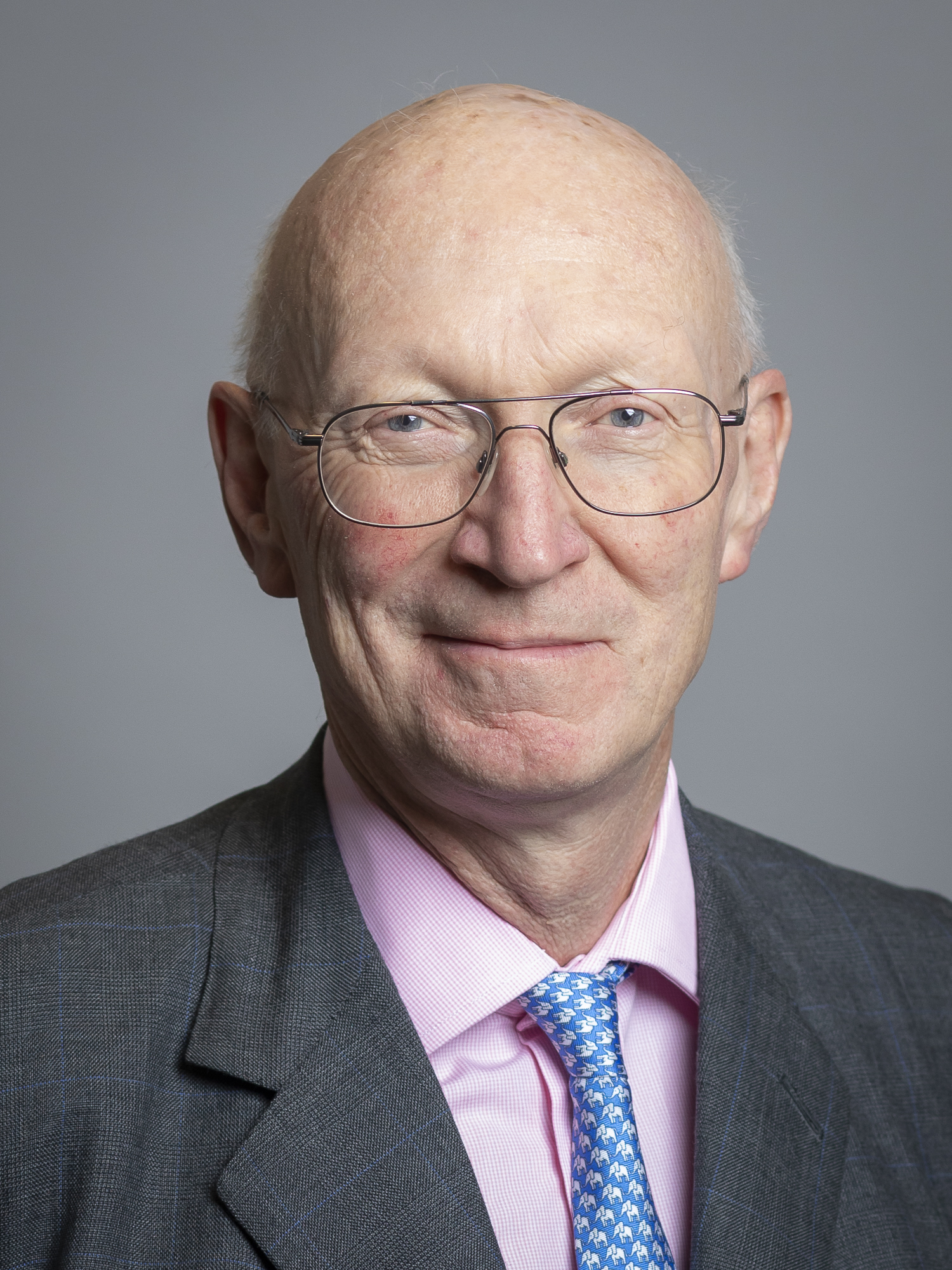
- Prior in 2020

Chair of NHS England
- In office 31 October 2018 – 22 January 2022
- Prime Minister: Theresa May; Boris Johnson
- Chief Executive: The Lord Stevens of Birmingham; Amanda Pritchard
- Preceded by: Malcolm Grant
- Succeeded by: Richard Meddings

Parliamentary Under-Secretary of State for Business, Energy and Industrial Strategy
- In office 21 December 2016 – 27 October 2017
- Prime Minister: Theresa May
- Preceded by: Position established
- Succeeded by: The Lord Henley

Parliamentary Under-Secretary of State for National Health Services Productivity
- In office 14 May 2015 – 21 December 2016
- Prime Minister: David Cameron; Theresa May
- Preceded by: The Earl Howe
- Succeeded by: The Lord O'Shaughnessy

Member of the House of Lords
- Lord Temporal
- Life peerage 29 May 2015

Member of Parliament for North Norfolk
- In office 1 May 1997 – 14 May 2001
- Preceded by: Ralph Howell
- Succeeded by: Norman Lamb

Personal details
- Born: 3 December 1954 (age 71)
- Party: Independent (since 2018)
- Other political affiliations: Conservative (until 2018)
- Spouse: Caroline Holmes
- Parent(s): Jim Prior; Jane Lywood
- Education: Pembroke College, Cambridge

David Gifford Leathes Prior, Baron Prior of Brampton (born 3 December 1954) is the former chairman of NHS England and chairman of University College Hospital. He served as Conservative Member of Parliament (MP) for North Norfolk from 1997 until the 2001 general election, when he lost his seat to Norman Lamb of the Liberal Democrats by 483 votes. In 2015, he was appointed as a life peer in the House of Lords.

== Early life ==
The son of Conservative politician James Prior, he was educated at Charterhouse School and Pembroke College, Cambridge, where he gained an exhibition and MA degree in Law.

During his time at Cambridge, he helped to launch the Cambridge University Industrial Society, a student group, which subsequently spread to many other UK universities. He was Chairman of the Cambridge University Conservative Association and was elected an officer of Cambridge University Students’ Union.

== Career ==
From 1977 to 1980, he worked for the investment banks Lehman Brothers and Lazard Frères in New York, training as an investment banker, and qualified as a barrister in 1976, becoming a member of Gray's Inn. He was seconded to the British Steel Corporation to work with Sir Ian MacGregor. He was appointed Managing director of British Steel Service Centres Ltd and later appointed Commercial Director British Steel, establishing joint ventures in China, Turkey, Europe and North America. After British Steel, he managed a number of private steel and manufacturing businesses.

He was elected as MP for North Norfolk in 1997 and he became Chief Executive of the Conservative Party and its deputy chairman and a member of the trade and industry select committee. In 2002 he was appointed chairman of the Norfolk and Norwich University Hospital NHS Trust, resigning in November 2006. He was acting chairman of the Conservative Party in 2001. In the same year, he was made Honorary Doctor at Anglia Ruskin University.

On 14 November 2006, he was arrested, among others, by Norfolk Constabulary investigating allegations of financial irregularities at Cawston Park Hospital previously known as Cawston College, a private psychiatric hospital in Cawston, Norfolk. He was cleared of involvement in the alleged fraud on 15 February 2007 and subsequently reappointed as chairman of the Norfolk and Norwich University Hospital NHS Trust. In 2009, he was invited to be Chairman of Ormiston Victory Academy in Norwich. He founded and chairs two free schools, the Jane Austen College, and Sir Isaac Newton Free School, a sixth-form college specialising in sciences and mathematics. He is also the chairman of Norwich Primary Academy. In 2012, he became a Trustee of the Inspiration Trust. From 2005 to 2009 he was Chairman of Friends of Families House.

On 28 January 2013 he was appointed as Chairman of the Care Quality Commission. He was said by the Health Service Journal to be the 23rd most powerful person in the English NHS in December 2013. In April 2014 he had a hip replacement operation paid for by private insurance but was treated in a public ward at the Norfolk and Norwich University Hospital NHS Trust.

In March 2015 he told a conference that "the role of the market is hugely limited in health and social care, in part because many of the people who need care the most – as many homeless people are – are often unheard; they have no power. The market requires people with power, people who can choose [in order to bring improvement]. In healthcare that’s not the case.” His stance appeared to conflict with the assumptions underlying the Health and Social Care Act 2012.

On 14 May 2015, David Prior was appointed Parliamentary Under-Secretary of State for Health in David Cameron's Conservative ministry and subsequently created a Life Peer as Baron Prior of Brampton, of Swannington in the County of Norfolk on 29 May 2015. He was reckoned by the Health Service Journal to be the twelfth most influential person in the English NHS in 2015.

In October 2016, Prior said the result of the 2016 United Kingdom European Union membership referendum was "a terrible mistake". Additionally, he expressed his support for remaining in the European single market.

On 21 December 2016, he was appointed as Parliamentary Under Secretary of State at the Department for Business, Energy and Industrial Strategy. A large part of this role was the development of the Government's new industrial strategy. He resigned from the Government in October 2017.

On 5 September 2018, he was invited to attend a pre-appointment hearing with the Health Select Committee prior to being appointed Chair of NHS England, succeeding Sir Malcolm Grant. His appointment was for four years from 31 October 2018. He resigned the Conservative whip in October 2018. His term ended upon the confirmation of his successor, Richard Meddings, in January 2022.

Parliament of the United Kingdom
Preceded by Ralph Howell	Member of Parliament for Norfolk North; 1997–2001	Succeeded by Norman Lamb
Orders of precedence in the United Kingdom
Preceded by The Lord Bridges of Headley	Gentlemen; Baron Prior of Brampton	Followed by The Lord Keen of Elie
