= Saunders v Anglia Building Society =

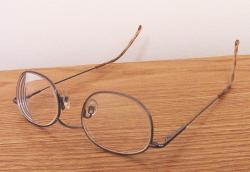
- Court: House of Lords
- Full case name: Also Gallie v Lee, in the House of Lords
- Citations: [1970] UKHL 5, [1971] AC 1004, [1970] 3 All ER 961

Case history
- Prior action: [1968] 2 All ER 322

Case opinions
- Lord Reid

Keywords
- Non est factum

Saunders v Anglia Building Society [1970] UKHL 5 also known as Gallie v Lee is an English contract law case in the United Kingdom. It established that in contract law the burden lies with the plaintiff to demonstrate he has not acted negligently and, that consequently, the plea of non est factum cannot normally be claimed by a person of full capacity.

== Facts ==
Mrs Gallie, who had broken her spectacles, signed a document without first informing herself of its contents. She was lied to by her nephew's business partner, Mr Lee, that the documents were merely to confirm a gift of her house to her nephew. In fact, she signed papers allowing the nephew's business partner to grant a mortgage over the property in favour of Anglia Building Society. When the business partner defaulted on the mortgage, Anglia Building Society claimed to foreclose and repossess the House. Mrs Gallie died before the litigation reached the House of Lords, and was represented by Saunders.

== Judgment ==
=== Court of Appeal ===
Lord Denning MR, reversing the judge’s decision, found that Mrs Gallie was out of luck. Grown literate people cannot simply get away with signing things, and not being bound.

=== House of Lords ===
The House of Lords upheld the Court of Appeal, though disapproving of the strength of Lord Denning’s criticisms.

Lord Reid said the defence is unavailable for the following reasons.

it must also apply in favour of those who are permanently or temporarily unable through no fault of their own to have without explanation any real understanding of the purport of a particular document, whether that be from defective education, illness or innate incapacity... There must, I think, be a radical difference between what he signed and what he thought he was signing - or one could use the words “fundamental” or “serious” or “very substantial.” But what amounts to a radical difference will depend on all the circumstances.

== See also ==
- English contract law
- Mistakes in English law
