= Seatrade =

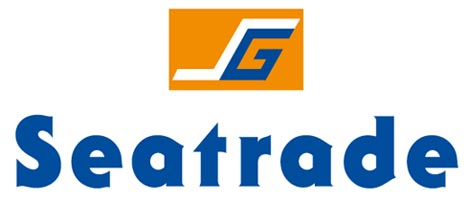

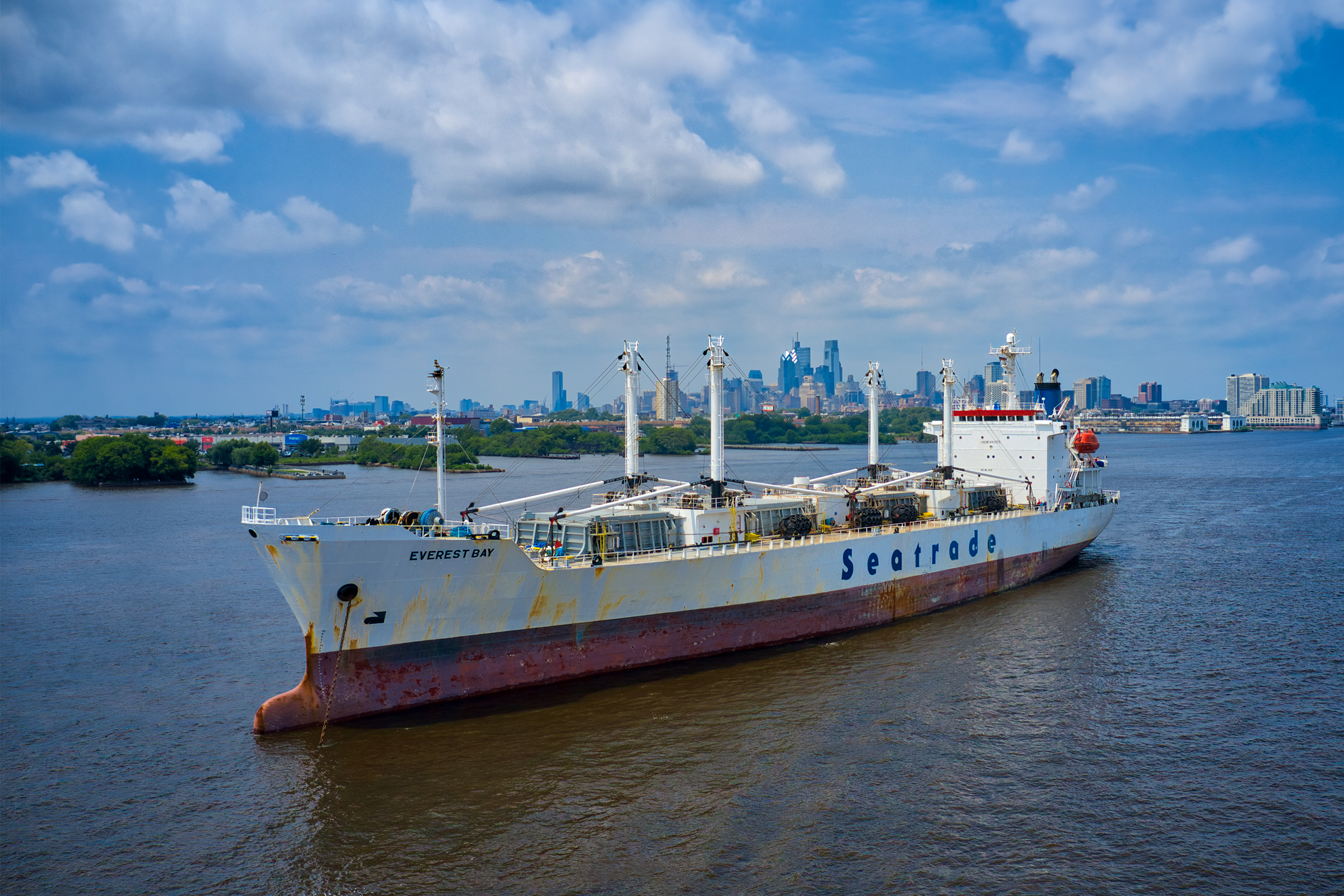
- Company type: Public Anonymous Venture (N.V.)
- Industry: Reefer Shipping; Specialised reefer container vessels
- Predecessor: 1951 Scheepvaartkantoor Groningen; 1973 Seatrade Groningen BV
- Founded: 1951
- Headquarters: Antwerp, Belgium
- Number of locations: Worldwide
- Website: www.seatrade.com

Seatrade is an Antwerp-based international transportation and shipping company specialised in the transport of perishables and other sensitive cargoes. Seatrade is the largest specialized refrigerated shipping company in the world, operating a fleet of near 100 specialised refrigerated vessels.

The company was founded in 1951.
