= TSB Bank (United Kingdom) =

British retail bank

TSB Bank plc
- Type: Subsidiary
- Industry: Banking; Financial services
- Predecessor: Lloyds TSB; Cheltenham & Gloucester
- Founded: 1810; 216 years ago as the Trustee Savings Bank; 2013; 13 years ago re-established as TSB Bank
- Headquarters: Edinburgh, Scotland, UK
- Number of locations: 175 branches (2025)
- Area served: United Kingdom
- Key people: David Oldfield (chair); Nicola Bannister (chief executive)
- Products: Retail banking Commercial banking General insurance Life insurance
- Revenue: £1.1 billion (2022)
- Net income: £181 million (2022)
- Number of employees: 5,592 (2022)
- Parent: Santander UK
- Website: www.tsb.co.uk

TSB Bank plc is a British retail and commercial bank based in Edinburgh, Scotland. It is a subsidiary of Santander UK.

As of 2025, TSB Bank operates a network of 175 branches. TSB was launched on 9 September 2013. Its headquarters are located in Edinburgh, Scotland, and it has more than five million customers with over £37 billion of lending and £36 billion of customer deposits. The bank was formed from the existing business of Lloyds TSB Scotland plc, into which a number of Lloyds TSB branches in England and Wales and all branches of Cheltenham & Gloucester were transferred, and renamed TSB Bank plc.

A European Commission ruling that the British government's 2009 purchase of a 43% stake in Lloyds Banking Group counted as state aid made it necessary for Lloyds Banking Group to sell a portion of its business; TSB was divested. Post-divestment, TSB offered an initial public offering and was listed on the London Stock Exchange in June 2014. In 2015, it was acquired by Sabadell Group. On 30 April 2026, Santander UK acquired TSB from Sabadell for £2.65 billion.

== History ==
=== Trustee Savings Bank ===
The TSB name was previously used by Trustee Savings Bank prior to its merger with Lloyds Bank in 1995, resulting in the formation of Lloyds TSB in 1999.

The merger was structured as a reverse takeover by TSB. Lloyds Bank was delisted from the London Stock Exchange and TSB Group was renamed Lloyds TSB Group in 1995, with former Lloyds Bank shareholders owning a 70% equity interest in the share capital, effected through a scheme of arrangement. The new bank commenced trading in 1999, after the statutory process of integration was completed. The original TSB Bank transferred engagements to Lloyds Bank which then changed its name to Lloyds TSB Bank; at the same time, TSB Bank Scotland absorbed Lloyds' three Scottish branches becoming Lloyds TSB Scotland.

In 1986, the legal entity, Trustee Savings Bank, was renamed TSB Scotland (and, in 1989, TSB Bank Scotland), before becoming Lloyds TSB Scotland in 1999. This company was re-registered under the name TSB Bank in 2013. The parent, TSB Banking Group, was registered in England in 2014 and later that year TSB Bank ceased to be part of the Lloyds Banking Group.

=== Project Verde ===
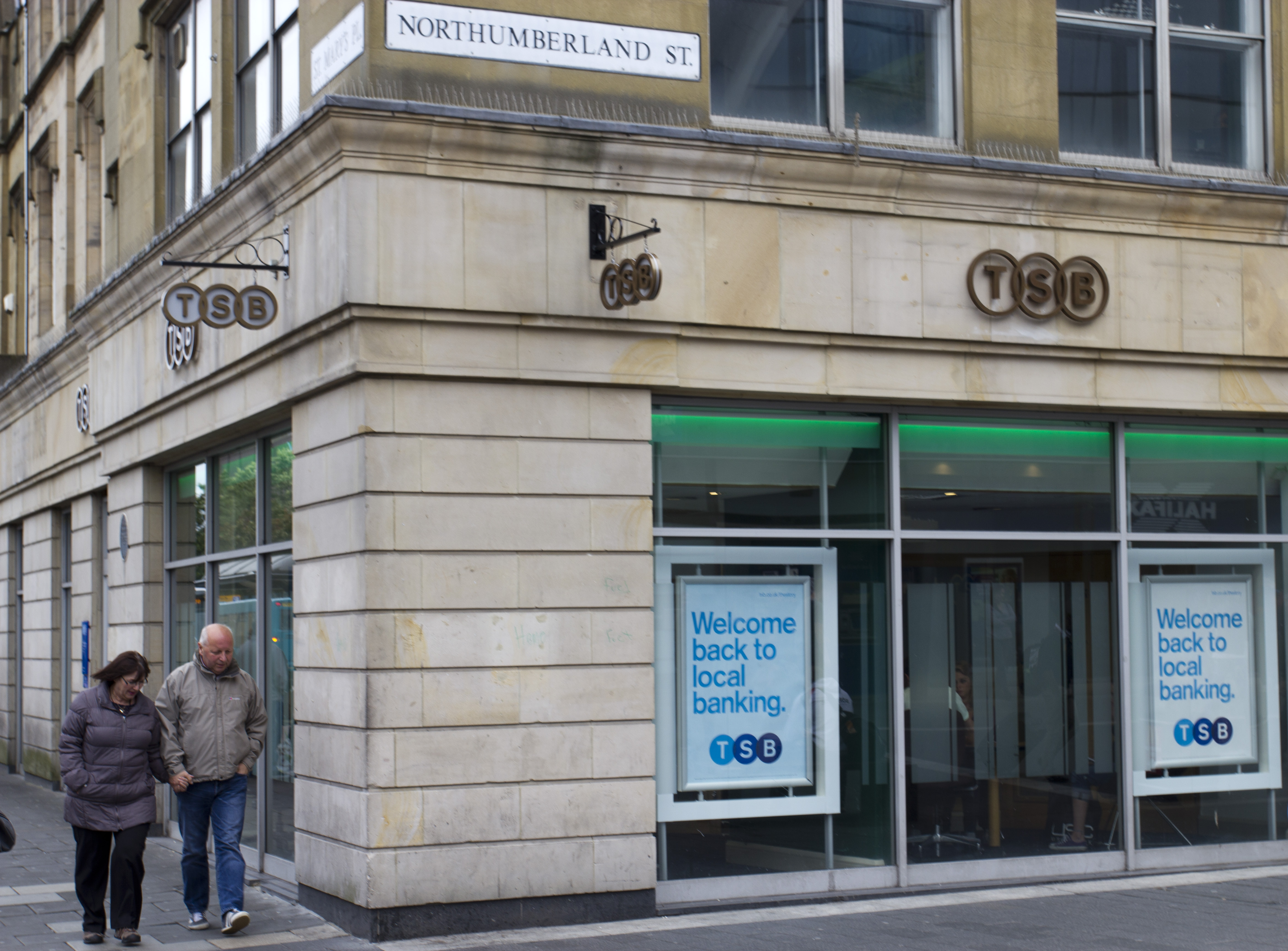
TSB Newcastle city centre, a former Lloyds TSB branch

In January 2009, Lloyds TSB Group bought HBOS, the company formed from the merger of Halifax plc and the Bank of Scotland, and renamed itself Lloyds Banking Group. In 2009, following the UK bank rescue package, the Government of the United Kingdom took a 43.4% stake in Lloyds Banking Group, which later announced that it would sell a standalone retail banking business and most accounts held at selected branches in order to comply with European Commission state aid requirements. Codenamed "Verde", the group's divestment plan identified 632 branches - a number of Lloyds TSB branches in England and Wales, together with all branches of Lloyds TSB Scotland and Cheltenham & Gloucester, were brought together to form the new business, which operates under the TSB brand.

Customers with accounts held by the branches and staff employed within them were also transferred.

Not all of the branches transferred to TSB had belonged to that brand previously; some Lloyds branches (including those sort codes) were assigned to TSB as part of the process. The remainder of the Lloyds TSB business was rebranded back to the Lloyds Bank name.

=== Agreement with Co-operative Banking Group ===
Lloyds Banking Group reached a heads-of-terms agreement in July 2012 to sell the Verde branches to the Co-operative Bank for £750 million. The final transfer of TSB Bank to the new owner was planned to be completed by late 2013. In February 2013, it was reported that Lloyds Banking Group was considering a stock market flotation of the TSB business as an alternative, should the transfer not be completed, and they would make a final decision by the end of July. The Co-operative Banking Group blamed current economic conditions for delays in completing the deal and had sold its life insurance assets for £200 million in an effort to secure £1 billion needed to complete the deal.

In April 2013, The Co-operative Group announced that it would not proceed with the transaction, citing the economic environment and increasing regulatory requirements in the financial sector.

=== Initial public offering ===
TSB Bank plc began operating as a separate business within Lloyds Banking Group on 9 September 2013, with the intention of selling it off through an initial public offering. Lloyds Banking Group announced that 25% of TSB's shares would be floated on 24 June 2014, but, with the offer being ten-times oversubscribed, 38.5% of shares in TSB Banking Group, were sold at 260p on 20 June. Unconditional trading in the shares started on 25 June 2014. A further 11.5% of TSB Banking Group shares were sold by Lloyds Banking Group in September 2014, bringing its share holding down to 50%.

According to Lloyds' chief executive, António Horta-Osório, the separation cost £1 billion more to perform than the new bank is worth.

=== Acquisition by Sabadell Group ===
On 12 March 2015, TSB confirmed a takeover bid by Sabadell for £1.7 billion, less than a year after it rejoined the stock market through Lloyds Banking Group's sale of 50% of its holding. TSB agreed to the takeover on 20 March 2015 which was completed on 8 July 2015. After the acquisition, a new board of directors was formed, including Tomás Varela and Miguel Montes Güell.

In October 2015, Sabadell Group outlined its plans for TSB to continue as a competitor in the UK banking sector, by further expanding into the small business banking market, and introducing cardless emergency cash and mobile payments. Sabadell also confirmed that the TSB name would be retained, as the group felt it was a "very powerful" brand with "traction" in the UK, unlike the parent brand, which is "virtually unknown". TSB's banking platform, which had used that of Lloyds Banking Group, was migrated to a UK-based replica of Sabadell's Proteo platform by the end of 2017.

==== Migration to the Sabadell Proteo banking platform ====
A planned migration of customer records from the Lloyds Banking Group platform to the Sabadell Proteo platform commencing on 20 April 2018 resulted in the loss of internet and mobile banking services for many customers for at least a week. Additionally, some customers reported seeing detailed account information of other customers, including balances of accounts other than their own.

On 26 April 2018, Paul Pester, then chief executive, stated that TSB was "on its knees" with the bank's computers continuing to have "a capacity issue" that was preventing about one million customers having access to online banking services.

Two weeks after commencement of the migration, failures were still being reported with services such as the online banking application giving internal SQL database-related errors. Payment difficulties, particularly with business and mortgage accounts continued into a fourth week and it was revealed that TSB had rejected an offer of assistance from Lloyds Banking Group at the start of the migration crisis. The bank later announced it had hired IBM to help fix the problems. A former TSB board member was quoted by the BBC as saying "human error, pride and software failure" led to TSB's "dreadful" response. There were further problems affecting login to online services, and the ability to transfer money on 3 September.

On 4 September 2018, Pester resigned due to the IT failure, and Richard Meddings, the non-executive chairman, became executive chairman until a new CEO could be found. In November 2018 TSB announced Debbie Crosbie as new CEO.

In 2019 TSB returned to profit. In November 2019, TSB was struck by "new IT glitch". TSB closed 82 branches in 2020 to cut down expenses. Further branch closures in 2021 and 2022 brought the network down to 220 branches.

In 2022, the bank was fined £48.65 million for the poor migration process. In 2023, the Prudential Regulation Authority personally fined Carlos Abarca £81,000 for his part in the debacle. He had been the chief information officer at the TSB at the time. The fine was reduced from £116,600 after he agreed to settle the matter.

=== Acquisition by Santander ===
On 1 July 2025, it was announced that Sabadell had agreed to sell TSB to Spanish rival Santander for £2.65 billion. Sabadell shareholders approved the sale on 6 August 2025, and, following approval from the Prudential Regulation Authority and European Central Bank, it completed on 30 April 2026. Santander intends to use a banking business transfer scheme to integrate TSB's business with its own in the first half of 2027, subject to court and regulatory approval. The Financial Times has reported that the TSB brand after 216 years will be retired following the integration.

== Corporate affairs ==
=== Identity ===
TSB's logo is similar to the logo of the former Trustee Savings Bank and consists of three interlocking circles in varying shades of blue bearing the name of the bank. Since its launch in 2013, TSB has used the slogan "Local banking for Britain" rather than "The bank that likes to say yes" slogan used by the former Trustee Savings Bank. TSB's launch advertising campaign featured a short film about the bank's founder Henry Duncan and was voiced by Patrick Stewart.

=== Locations ===
On its formation in September 2013, TSB Bank plc had:

- 631 branches, of which:
  - 282 were former Lloyds TSB branches in England and Wales
  - 164 were former Cheltenham & Gloucester branches
  - 185 were former Lloyds TSB Scotland branches
- Administration centres in Edinburgh, Bristol, Gloucester, Birmingham and London
- Telephony centres in Sunderland and Swansea

== Services ==
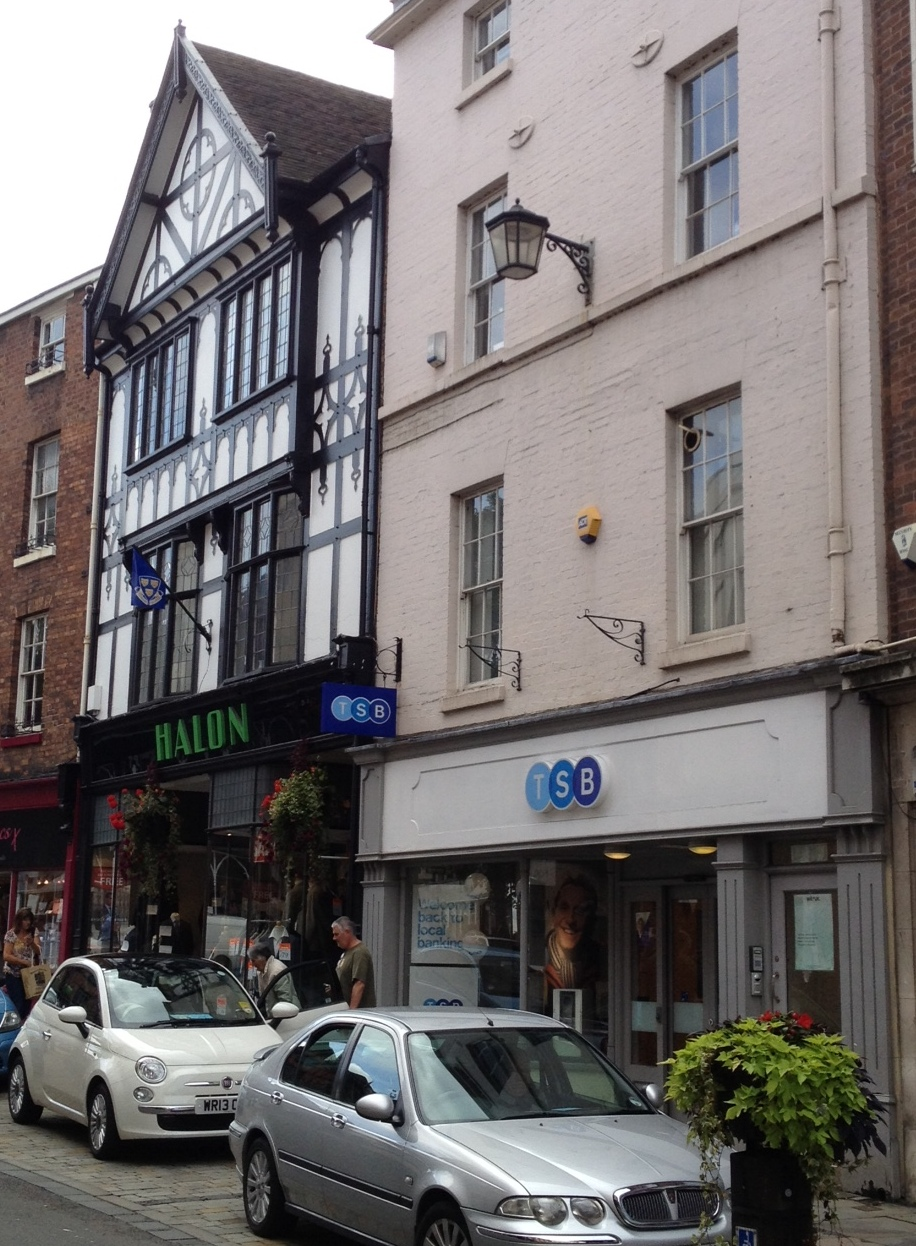
A branch of TSB, formerly Cheltenham & Gloucester, on the High Street in Shrewsbury

The bank offers a full range of personal and business banking and financial services, including current accounts, mortgages, credit products, insurance, and savings products. TSB Bank is authorised by the Prudential Regulation Authority and regulated by both the Financial Conduct Authority and the Prudential Regulation Authority. It is a member of the Financial Ombudsman Service and the Financial Services Compensation Scheme, and subscribes to the Lending Code. The bank has an agreement with Visa Inc. to issue Visa Debit cards to its current account customers.

The bank uses the following series of sorting codes:—

Range	Note
30 to 39	former Lloyds TSB branches (in turn pre-merger Lloyds Bank branches) in England & Wales; former C&G Savings codes (used until early 2014) (Note: C&G branches used sort codes in the 30-55 to 30-61 range until becoming TSB in September 2013, and continued using them as TSB branches until early 2014, when each was upgraded to offer the full range of TSB products and services and given a new 77 or 87 sort code.)
77-00 to 77-44; 77-46 to 77-99	former Lloyds TSB branches (in turn pre-merger TSB branches) in England & Wales; former C&G branches in England & Wales (allocated new sort codes in 2014)
87	former Lloyds TSB Scotland branches; former C&G branches in Scotland (allocated new sort codes in 2014)

== Whistletree ==
Whistletree
- Type: Trading division
- Industry: Banking
- Founded: 2015
- Headquarters: Skipton, United Kingdom
- Services: Mortgages
- Website: www.whistletree.co.uk

Whistletree is a trading division of TSB Bank plc which was established to administer mortgage and other loans acquired by TSB from other lenders. It is served by a standalone website and separate contact centre, with TSB branch staff have no access to Whistletree accounts. The division's name refers to the blue tree branding used by TSB Bank and the whistling that features in its television advertising.

Whistletree was formed in 2015 to administer the £3.3 billion in mortgages assets that TSB purchased in November 2015 from the nationalised NRAM plc, the "bad bank" formed from the former Northern Rock. The acquisition was completed in July 2016.

In January 2017, TSB Bank plc agreed to acquire the loan and mortgage assets of Airdrie Savings Bank which was wound up on 28 April 2017. These assets are also administered by the Whistletree division of the bank.

== See also ==
- List of banks in the United Kingdom
