= Richard Meddings =

British banker

Richard Meddings CBE
- Born: Richard Henry Meddings; 1958 (age 67–68)
- Education: Exeter College, Oxford
- Occupation: Banker
- Board member of: Credit Suisse
- Children: 3

Richard Henry Meddings, CBE (born 1958) is a British banker.

== Early life ==
Meddings was educated at Wolverhampton Grammar School. He earned a degree in modern history from Exeter College, Oxford.

== Career ==
Meddings trained as a chartered accountant with Price Waterhouse.

He then worked for Hill Samuel and BZW, before becoming FD of Woolwich plc in 1999.

He was a board member of Standard Chartered for 11 years and its finance director for seven years. During this period he was named Blue Chip FD of the Year in the 2009 Accountancy Age Awards. In January 2014 the bank "stunned the City" by announcing his resignation, albeit this did come after a period of high losses, a rights issue and a cancelled dividend for the bank He said it was "totally my decision to leave".

In February 2018, Meddings succeeded Will Samuel as chairman of TSB Bank. Following the resignation of CEO Paul Pester in September 2018 following an IT failure, Meddings, then non-executive chairman, became executive chairman until a new CEO could be found.

Meddings was a non-executive board member of HM Treasury for over seven years until December 2021. In January 2022 he was appointed as chair of NHS England for a four-year term.

In 2020 he took on board committee roles at Credit Suisse.

Meddings was appointed Commander of the Order of the British Empire (CBE) in the 2022 New Year Honours for services to the financial sector.

== Personal life ==
Meddings is married with three children, enjoys golf, cricket and football, and supports Wolverhampton Wanderers.
