= Derbyshire Building Society =

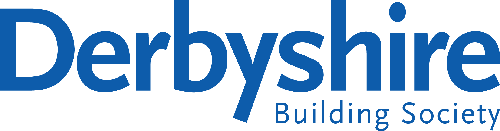
- Company type: Building society, trading division (mutual)
- Industry: Banking and financial services
- Founded: 1859
- Headquarters: Duffield, England, UK
- Products: Savings, mortgages, investments, loans, credit cards, insurance
- Net income: £8.7 million GBP (December 2007), 47.0% on 2006
- Total assets: £7.1 billion GBP (December 2007), 17.8% on 2006
- Parent: Nationwide Building Society
- Website: www.thederbyshire.co.uk

Derbyshire Building Society (previously trading as The Derbyshire) was a UK building society based in Duffield, Derbyshire in the East Midlands of England. It was the 9th largest building society in the United Kingdom based on total assets of £7.1 billion at 31 December 2007, until it was acquired by Nationwide Building Society on 1 December 2008.

== History ==
The society was formed as the Derby Building and Investment Society, with an initial £120 shares offered, in January 1847. It was a terminating society which, having achieved its purpose a year ahead of schedule, was wound up in May 1859.

One of the Directors, Samuel Whitaker, decided to invite a group of business friends to a meeting on 12 August 1859 to discuss the preliminary arrangements for the formation of a permanent society. An immediate decision was taken and on 1 September 1859, the rules of The Derbyshire Permanent Building, Investment and Land Society were registered. Rev Gervase Wright was appointed the chairman and Samuel Whitaker became the first secretary of the society, which was based at the offices of S Whitaker & Sons at 14 Iron Gate, Derby.

The first subscriptions were received on 15 September 1859 and the society was advertised for the first time in The Derby Mercury on 21 September 1859. In December 1859, the first advance was made to Mr Richard Ashby for £50.

From the start the society flourished largely due to the efforts of both the Chairman Rev. Gervase Wright and the Secretary Samuel Whitaker, with additional regular subscription meetings being held in Ripley and Matlock by early 1860, such that by December 1860 there were 456 members and 41 advances of over £6,000.

In early 1870, the society's assets had grown to £56,000 and the need for larger premises lead to the offices moving to 4 Victoria Street, Derby, where it remained for many years. By 1876, the society's assets had grown to £123,700, though the industrial depression which lasted for the next decade, affected the society's further growth.

In 1893, the society's Head Offices moved offices to 2 Victoria Street, Derby and in 1896 the society changed its name to "The Derbyshire Permanent Benefit Building Society".

By 1900, there were 2,286 building societies in Great Britain with combined assets of £59 million, only 3 of which had assets of more than £250,000. By that time, the society's assets stood at £188,000, making the society one of the largest in the country.

In 1966, the society merged with the Ashbourne Permanent Benefit Building Society and the Somercotes Building Society. The society had a branch in Leabrooks Road in Somercotes. It also absorbed the Ilkeston Permanent Building Society in 2001.

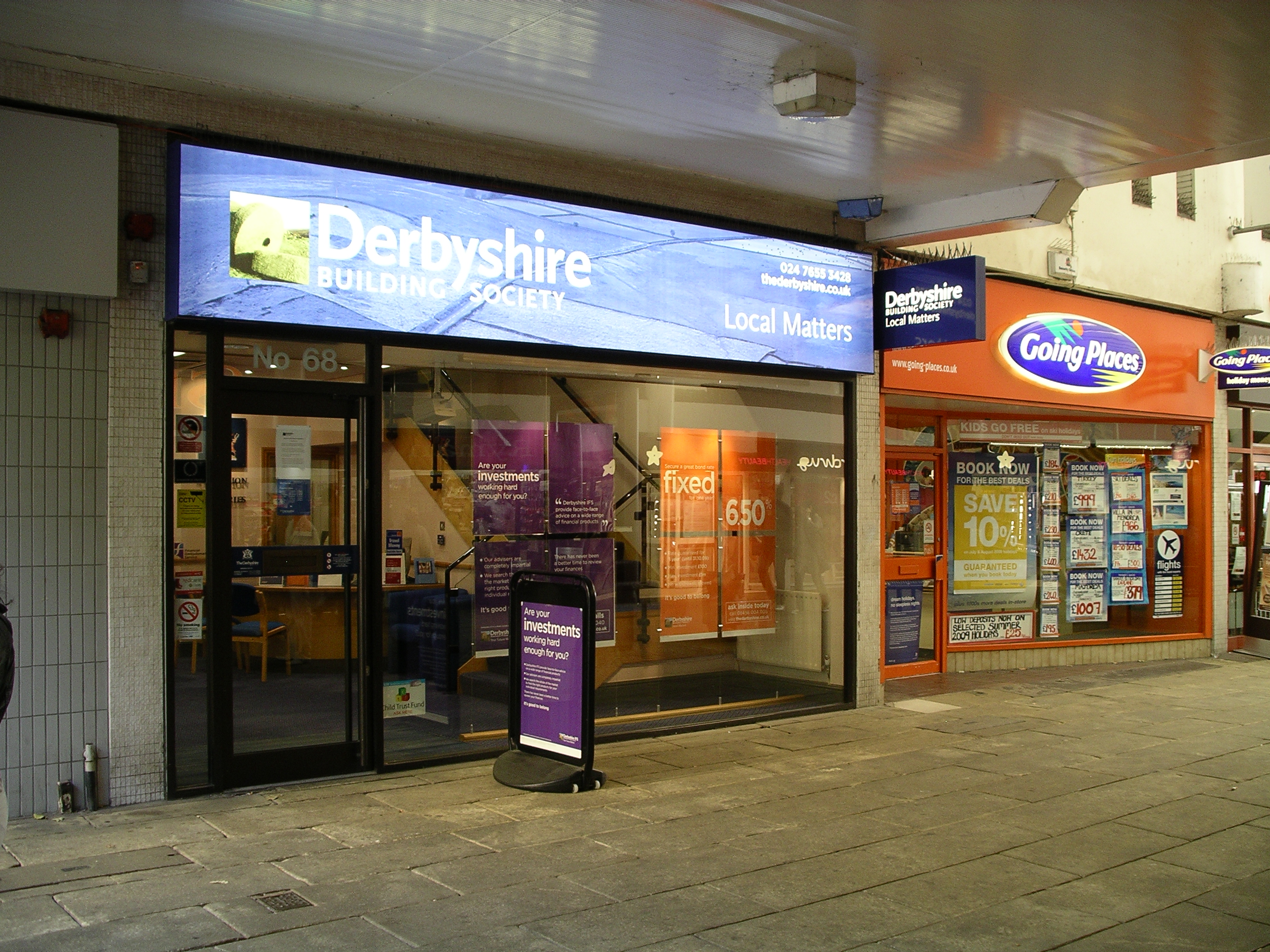
The branch in Coventry (signage before Nationwide merger)

On 8 September 2008 it was announced that the Derbyshire, along with the Cheshire Building Society, had agreed to a merger with the Nationwide Building Society, the largest such institution. The merger was borne out of increasing fears about the financial security of both the Derbyshire and the Cheshire societies with the former expected to post half-yearly losses of £17 million and the latter posting losses of £10.5 million. As a result of these projected losses no windfall payments were made to the savers of the smaller societies. Unusually there was no vote amongst members as to this proposition, after a special resolution under the Building Societies Act enabling a faster merger. It continued to operate as a trading division of the Nationwide Building Society, with 50 branches, for a few years after it had been acquired.

== Sponsorship ==
Between 2005 and 2008, Derbyshire Building Society was the main kit sponsor of English football club Derby County.

== Arms ==
Coat of arms of Derbyshire Building Society
Notes Granted 20 March 1959. Crest On a wreath Or and Gules upon a mount vert a ram passant Proper resting the dexter forehoof upon an escutcheon Purpure charged with a mitre Or. Escutcheon Or a Tudor Rose Proper on a chief Vert between two sprigs of thrift each of three flowers a castle of three towers the portcullis raised all Gold. Supporters On either side a stag Proper gorged with a collar of park palings Or and holding in the mouth a sprig of broom also Proper. Motto Bene Serviendo

== See also ==
- Derbyshire Group Staff Union
