= Paul Pester =

British banker (born 1964)

- Born: 14 January 1964 (age 62)
- Occupation: Businessman
- Known for: Virgin Money; TSB Bank; Tandem Money

Paul David Pester (born 14 January 1964) is a British businessman and executive. He is currently the Chairman of Tandem Bank. Pester is also a non-executive Director and co-founder of FinTech accelerator, Archie. He was chief executive officer (CEO) of TSB Bank from 2013 to 2018.

== Early life ==
Pester grew up in Plymouth. He was educated at Tamar High School, Plymouth. He has a first class honours degree in physics from the University of Manchester, and a doctorate (DPhil) in mathematical physics from Brasenose College, University of Oxford in 1988.

== Career ==
Pester was employed by McKinsey & Co as a management consultant, before being appointed Group CEO of Virgin Money. During Pester's tenure as CEO, Virgin Money Group launched in Australia. He then began working in various senior roles for Lloyds TSB, Santander and Lloyds Banking Group.

In May 2011, Pester was appointed as the CEO of Project Verde and tasked with overseeing the divestment of 632 bank branches into a new bank in order to comply with a ruling of the European Commission. The divestment was required as a result of Lloyds TSB having received state aid from the British government during the 2008 financial crisis. The new bank was eventually named TSB.

Pester was appointed in 2013 to launch TSB for the Lloyds Banking Group and, in June 2014, led the listing of the bank's shares on the London Stock Exchange. During this time, the BBC reported that he could earn more than £1.6 million that year in pay and bonuses. He stepped down after a significant IT failure at the bank, which he took responsibility for. On stepping down, Pester took a substantial bonus. This was eventually found to be a ‘contractual severance pay agreement’ . Pester participated in subsequent investigations into the causes of the IT issues by the FCA, PRA and law firm Slaughter and May. Ultimately the root causes of the issues were identified as a failure by Sabadell's IT subsidiary. Pester was not found to have committed any wrongdoing by the FCA, PRA, and Slaughter and May.

In October 2015, Pester was appointed as an advisor to the Chancellor of the Exchequer and HM Treasury on competition issues in banking, sitting as a member of the High Level Treasury Advisory Group.

In 2020, Pester was appointed chair of the Fairer Finance Consumer Advisory Board. Pester co-founded Loop, a money-sharing social networking app, in 2021. Between 2022 and 2025, he was chairman of Tandem Money in 2022, during which period Tandem acquired Loop in April 2023. He has also advised private equity groups including KKR, Centerbridge, and Pollen Street Capital (the ultimate controller of Tandem).

In 2023, Pester co-founded the Fintech accelerator Archie.

== Personal life ==
Pester lives in London with his second wife, having divorced in 2015 and remarried in 2017. He is also a competitive swimmer and triathlete, having represented Team GBR in the 2022 European Aquathlon Championships in Bilbao.

Business positions
Preceded by New company	Chief Executive of TSB; September 2013 - September 2018	Succeeded by Richard Meddings
Preceded by	Managing Director of Consumer Banking & Payments at Lloyds TSB; September 2010 - June 2011	Succeeded by
Preceded by	Managing Director of Santander UK; September 2008 - September 2010	Succeeded by
Preceded by	Chief Executive of Moneyfacts; September 2007 - February 2008	Succeeded by
Preceded by	Managing Director of Consumer Banking at Lloyds TSB; August 2005 - September 2007	Succeeded by
Preceded by	Group Chief Executive of Virgin Money; March 1999 - July 2005	Succeeded by
