= Dunfermline Building Society =

Nationwide Building Society trading as Dunfermline Building Society
- Company type: Building Society (Mutual)
- Industry: Financial services
- Founded: 1869
- Defunct: 2014
- Headquarters: Dunfermline, Scotland, UK
- Products: Savings and Mortgages
- Parent: Nationwide Building Society
- Website: www.dunfermline.com

The Dunfermline Building Society was a building society and later a trading division of Nationwide Building Society, based in Dunfermline, Scotland. Before its 2009 merger with Nationwide, it was the largest building society in Scotland and the 12th largest in the United Kingdom based on total assets of £3.3 billion at 31 December 2007. It was a member of the Building Societies Association.

On 28 March 2009, reports indicated the Society was no longer viable, and would be put up for public sale, to be managed by the Bank of England. This process led to acquisition of the Society's branches, good loans and deposits by the Nationwide Building Society with the Bank of England assuming control of £1bn in commercial lending and the Society's poorer-quality and shared ownership mortgages.

== History ==
=== Formation and development ===
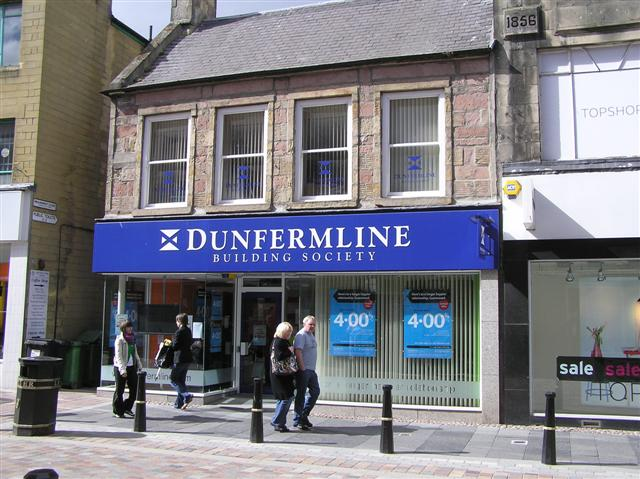
A former branch of the Dunfermline in Inverness

The Dunfermline Building Society was established in the town of Dunfermline from which it took its name in 1869.

A telephone banking service, Dunfermline Direct, was launched during Spring 1999.

By the end of 2005, the Society had 34 branches and 38 agencies throughout Scotland. Around 20% of its business was generated outwith Scotland. The Society also had a large commercial lending book and was leading the way in investment in social housing.

=== 2009 financial crisis ===
On 28 March 2009, reports indicated the building society was no longer viable, toxic assets would be stripped out and the remaining business put up for public sale, to be managed by the Tripartite Authorities (Bank of England, FSA and HM Treasury). BBC Scotland business editor Douglas Fraser broke the story, where a £26m loss was announced in late March 2009.

It was announced on 30 March that the Nationwide Building Society had bought the retail and wholesale deposits, branches, head office and most of the residential mortgage book of the Dunfermline, with the Bank of England assuming control of £1bn in commercial lending.

On 24 October 2013, Nationwide announced that Dunfermline Building Society would be merged with the company and all branches of the society were closed by 13 June 2014.
