= Cheshire Building Society =

English building society

- Company type: Building Society, Trading Division (Mutual)
- Industry: Financial services
- Founded: 1870
- Headquarters: Macclesfield, England, UK
- Products: Savings, Mortgages, Investments, Loans, Credit Cards, Insurance
- Net income: £5.1 million GBP (December 2007), 50.5% on 2006
- Total assets: £5.0 billion GBP (December 2007), 5.5% on 2006
- Number of employees: 400+
- Parent: Nationwide Building Society
- Website: www.thecheshire.co.uk

The Cheshire Building Society was a building society based in Macclesfield, Cheshire, England. It was the 11th largest building society in the United Kingdom based on total assets of £5 billion on 31 December 2007, prior to merging with the Nationwide Building Society, and was a member of the Building Societies Association. The Cheshire was acquired by Nationwide on 15 December 2008.

== History ==
Established in 1870 in Macclesfield, the Cheshire was one of the first permanent societies. The branch network extended throughout the North West and included 42 building society branches and 13 property service branches.

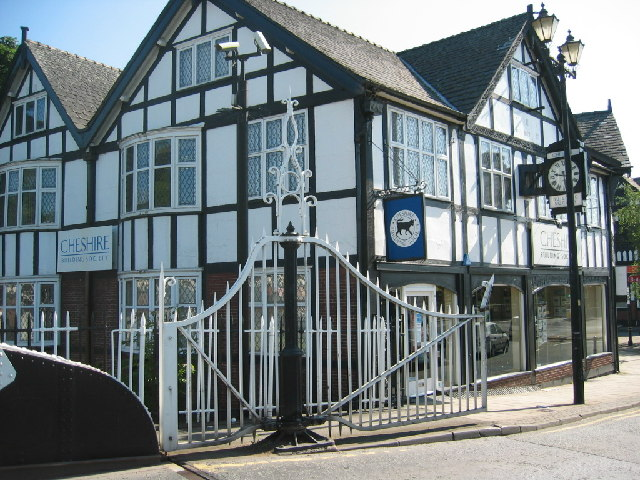
Branch of the Cheshire Building Society in Northwich.

On 8 September 2008, it was announced that the Cheshire, along with the Derbyshire Building Society, had agreed to a merger with the Nationwide Building Society, the largest such institution. The deal was concluded on 15 December 2008 with agreement from the Financial Services Authority and the Office of Fair Trading. The Nationwide initially kept the separate identities of the two societies.

== Sponsorship ==
The Cheshire Building Society sponsored the Careline campaign on the ITV1 Granada channel, which provided a phone number to call for support throughout Christmas and New Year.

The Cheshire Building Society also became the official club sponsor of Macclesfield Town F.C..
