= Anglia Building Society =

Defunct building society of the United Kingdom

- Type: Building Society (Mutual)
- Founded: 1848
- Defunct: 1987
- Fate: Merger
- Successor: Nationwide Building Society
- Headquarters: Northampton, United Kingdom

The Anglia Building Society in the United Kingdom was originally formed by the merger of the Northampton Town and County and Leicestershire building societies in 1966. In 1987, it merged with Nationwide Building Society, becoming Nationwide Anglia Building Society before reverting to the Nationwide name in 1992.

== History ==
=== Northampton Town and County ===
The Northampton Town and County Freehold Land Society was formed in 1848, later becoming Northampton Town and County Benefit Building Society. In 1950, the Wellingborough Town and District Permanent Benefit Building Society transferred engagements and in 1953, it became simply Northampton Town and County Building Society. This Society absorbed a number of other societies.

Date	Transfer of engagements
April 1957	Kingscliffe
Aug. 1957	Woburn Sands Permanent Benefit
Sept. 1957	Wolverton (Bucks) Permanent Benefit
June 1958	Watford & West Herts Permanent Benefit
Sept. 1958	Bognor Mutual
June 1959	City of Peterborough & District Permanent
Nov. 1961	Grimsby & Cleethorpes Permanent Benefit
Dec. 1964	General (formerly Amalgamated General)
Oct. 1965	Esher (formerly Kilburn)
Nov. 1966	Albion Permanent Benefit

=== Leicestershire ===
The Hinckley and South Leicestershire Permanent Benefit Building Society became Hinckley and Leicestershire Building Society in 1950 and finally Leicestershire Building Society in 1958. This merged with the Northampton Town and County in 1966, to form the Anglia. The new Society, headquartered in Northampton, absorbed a number of other societies.

Date	Transfer of engagements
Oct. 1967	Winchester City & District Mutual
Dec. 1968	Court Permanent Benefit
Dec. 1973	Blaby & Neighbourhood Permanent Benefit
Dec. 1974	Northampton & Midlands
Oct. 1975	Berkhamsted District
Dec. 1975	Northamptonshire Foresters

=== Hastings and Thanet ===
In 1978, the Society transferred its engagements to the Hastings and Thanet Building Society, itself formed by the merger of the Hastings Permanent and Isle of Thanet building societies in 1951, becoming for a short time Anglia Hastings and Thanet Building Society. In 1979, the Grimsby Building Society transferred engagements and in 1980, it once again became known as Anglia Building Society. The London and South of England Building Society transferred engagements in 1983 and the Country (including the engagements of the former Westminster) Building Society transferred in 1984.

In 1987, the Society merged with the Nationwide Building Society, which was formed in London in 1883 and known as the Co-operative Permanent Building Society until 1970.

== Coat of Arms ==
The Anglia Building Society was granted a coat of arms by the College of Arms in 1956 and regranted in 1968, upon its change in name.

Coat of arms of Anglia Building Society

Granted
The arms were officially granted on September 10, 1956 to the Northampton Town and County Building Society; regranted 1 October 1968 upon the change in name.
Crest
On a wreath of the colours, Upon a mount vert a griffin segreant Or resting the dexter claw upon a builder's trowel, point downward, proper.
Escutcheon
Per fesse gules and argent, in chief a tower triple towered of the second, the portcullis raised Or, and in base a double rose of the first barbed and seeded proper; all between two keys, wards downwards and outwards, counter changed.
Supporters
On either side a lion guardant Or gorged with a wreath argent and gules, pendant therefroni by a leather guige an escutcheon also gules, that on the dexter charged with a rose argent, barbed and seeded proper, and that on the sinister with a fetterlock gold.
Motto
Stability

== See also ==
- Saunders v Anglia Building Society
