= Portman Building Society =

Defunct British building society

- Company type: Building Society (Mutual)
- Industry: Banking and financial services
- Founded: 1846
- Defunct: August 2007
- Fate: Merger with Nationwide Building Society
- Successor: Nationwide Building Society
- Headquarters: Bournemouth, England, UK
- Products: Savings, Mortgages, Investments, Loans, Insurance, Pensions
- Website: www.nationwide.co.uk

The Portman Building Society was a mutual building society in the United Kingdom, providing mortgages and savings accounts to consumers and offering loans to commercial enterprises. Its head office was in Bournemouth and its administration centre in Wolverhampton. Portman merged with the Nationwide Building Society in August 2007.

== History ==
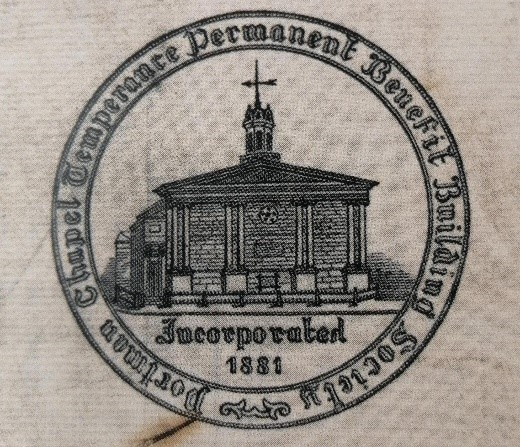
Image of Portman Chapel Temperance Permanent Benefit Building Society crest from a notice for the fourth Annual General Meeting for members

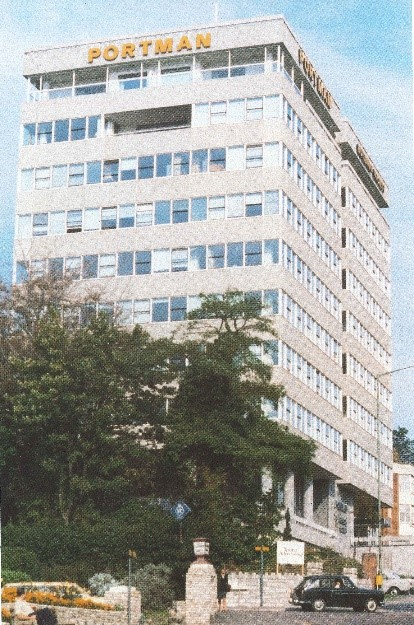
Portman House, Richmond Hill, Bournemouth – 1967

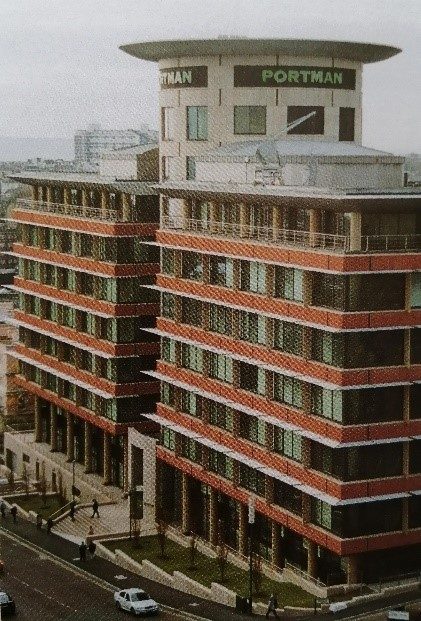
Portman House, Richmond Hill, Bournemouth – 2001

The society was founded as the Portman Chapel Temperance Permanent Benefit Building Society in London in 1881. It established a new head office at 415 Oxford Street in the early 20th century. It then established an administration centre, Portman House, in Bournemouth in 1967.

In July 1989, Wessex Building Society agreed for the transfer of engagements to the Portman Building Society and the society officially changed its name to Portman Wessex Building Society. Then in October 1990, the Portman Wessex Building Society merged with the Regency & West of England Building Society and the society reverted to its original name of Portman Building Society. The society also merged with the Ramsbury Building Society in 1990.

In 1997, the society decided to demolish the old Portman House and construct a new head office to meet its administration needs. This new head office was opened in 2001.

Mergers continued throughout the 1990s. In 1993, the St Pancras Building Society became part of the Portman and, in 1997, the Greenwich Building Society merged with the Portman. In 2003, the Portman merged with Staffordshire Building Society and, in 2006, it merged with Lambeth Building Society.

== Merger with Nationwide ==
On 12 September 2006, the society announced plans to merge with the Nationwide Building Society. Portman Members Against the Takeover, a protest group created to oppose the merger, argued that "there is nothing wrong with Portman; it can exist on its own", and cited loss of jobs, customer service and members' interests as reasons that the merger should not go ahead. The campaign attracted significant media attention. Bournemouth councillor Ron Whittaker, himself a Portman account holder, appealed to Portman members to vote against the merger and "not to be taken in by handouts", in reference to the windfall offered. Financial observers questioned the benefits of a merger (describing it as more akin to a takeover) citing issues such as job losses, less competitive rates and lower service standards as disadvantages.

Just months prior to the announcement of merger plans, Portman executive directors had argued that the interests of Portman members would be best served by it remaining an independent mutual building society. As part of the merger tender presented by the Nationwide, Portman executive directors were offered the incentive of better-paid jobs on the board of the Nationwide should the merger take place. The directors had further personal interest as a large portion of their bonuses was dependent on the merger being completed, a fact that was omitted from the merger booklet provided to Portman members and not disclosed until after the merger votes had been submitted. Merger information presented to voters suggested that they should vote in favour of the proposed merger, advice in contrast to that expressed by the same Portman board before they had received Nationwide's incentive-laden offer.

The merger was overwhelmingly endorsed by members at the society's AGM on 23 April 2007. After the Financial Services Authority (FSA) endorsed the members' decision on 26 July 2007, the society became part of the Nationwide on 28 August 2007. When the merger was announced it was anticipated that it would result in 900 redundancies.

Portman chief executive Robert Sharpe received a golden handshake of £1.7m and a pension worth £152,000 per year. He subsequently became chief executive of West Bromwich Building Society.
