= Nationwide Building Society =

British mutual financial institution

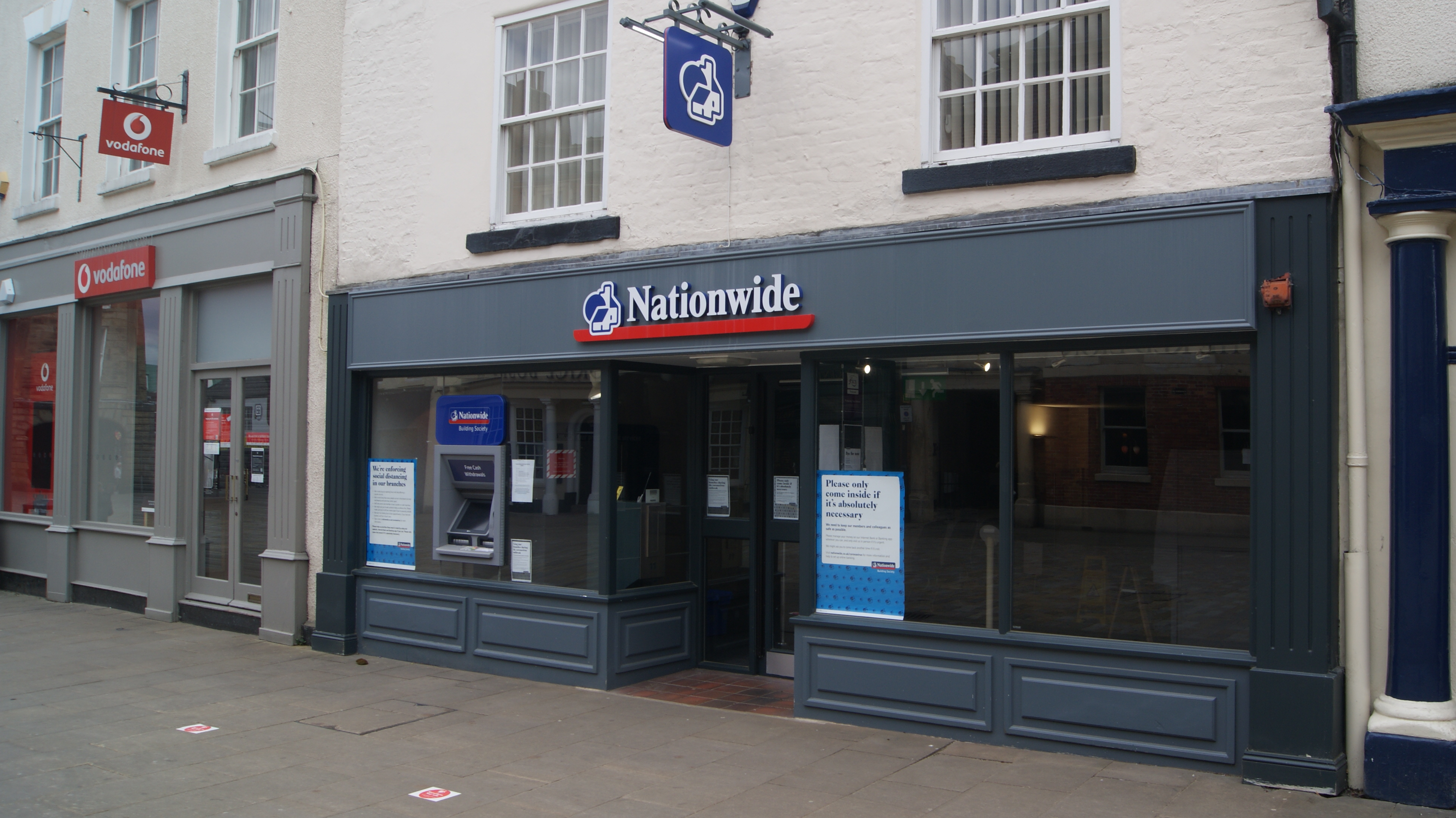
- A Nationwide Building Society branch in Pontefract, England, pictured in 2020
- Type: Building society, (mutual)
- Industry: Banking and financial services
- Founded: 1884; 142 years ago
- Headquarters: Swindon, England, UK
- Number of locations: 605
- Key people: Kevin Parry (Chairman); Debbie Crosbie (CEO)
- Products: Retail banking; savings; mortgages; investments; insurance; current accounts; loans; credit cards
- Revenue: ▼£6.38 billion (2026)
- Operating income: ▼£1.89 billion (2026)
- Net income: ▼£1.10 billion (2026)
- Total assets: ▲£382.3 billion (2026)
- Total equity: ▲£21.1 billion (2026)
- Number of employees: ▲17,978 (2026)
- Subsidiaries: Virgin Money UK, The Mortgage Works
- Website: nationwide.co.uk

Nationwide Building Society is a British mutual financial institution based in Swindon, England. It is the largest building society in the world.

As of 2024, it serves over 16 million members and operates entirely for their benefit, without shareholders. The society was established through the consolidation of over 250 smaller UK building societies throughout the 20th century, making it one of the most significant mutual mergers in British financial history. With headquarters in Swindon, England, Nationwide offers a wide range of retail banking services including mortgages, savings accounts, current accounts, credit cards, personal loans, and insurance products.

Nationwide is one of the largest cooperative financial institutions globally. As of June 2025, it reported total assets of £367.9 billion and employed 17,680 people. It operates 605 branches across the United Kingdom and it reaffirmed in 2025 its "Branch Promise" to maintain all branches until the start of 2030.

In October 2024, Nationwide completed its £2.9 billion acquisition of Virgin Money UK, adding over 6.6 million customers and expanding its customer base to more than 24.5 million.

The society is a member of the Building Societies Association and Co-operatives UK, and remains a leading advocate for mutual ownership and high street banking in the United Kingdom.

== History ==
The society's origins lie in the Co-operative Permanent Building Society, founded in January 1884. Based at New Oxford House, High Holborn, it changed its name in 1970 after deciding to leave the British Co-operative Union. The new name 'Nationwide' was put to a member vote, with members voting 135,675 to 15,585 in favour.

In 1987, the Northampton-based Anglia Building Society merged with Nationwide. The new society was known as Nationwide Anglia Building Society at first, but the Anglia name was dropped in 1991.

Nationwide launched an early UK internet banking service on 27 May 1997.

In 1999, Nationwide, together with various UK tabloid newspapers and media, launched a campaign against controversial cash machine fees. The campaign reached a peak when Barclays Bank announced a plan to charge all customers of rival banks and financial providers, including those of Nationwide, £1 for every cash machine withdrawal made from a Barclays-owned cash machine. This prompted Nationwide to warn Barclays that it would take legal action against the bank if it did not back down. Nationwide claimed Barclays had broken the rules of the LINK network of cash machines, which the bank had joined earlier in the year. The following year, withdrawals from most cash machines owned by UK banks were made free for customers of all banks and building societies throughout the UK.

=== 2000 – 2010 ===
In 2007, Nationwide members voted at its annual general meeting to donate at least 1% of pre-tax profits to charitable activities each year. Nationwide completed a merger with Portman Building Society on 28 August 2007, creating a mutual body with assets of over £160 billion and around 13 million members. Portman's earliest component was the Provident Union Building Society founded in Ramsbury, Wiltshire in 1846.

During the 2008 financial crisis, Nationwide acted to safeguard the mutual sector, acquiring the ailing Cheshire and Derbyshire building societies in September 2008, followed by the Dunfermline Building Society on 30 March 2009.

On 24 March 2009, Nationwide Building Society opened a direct savings branch in Dublin, Ireland called Nationwide UK (Ireland), to distinguish it from the unconnected and now-defunct Irish Nationwide Building Society.

=== 2010 – 2020 ===
In 2012, the society announced that it would integrate the Cheshire, Derbyshire and Dunfermline building societies into Nationwide. The Societies had operated under their own brands as divisions of the society. The rebranding of each business was phased, with the Dunfermline first to be merged in June 2014.

On 22 May 2015, it was announced that the society's chief executive, Graham Beale, intended to retire. On 16 November 2015, Nationwide announced that Joe Garner, CEO of Openreach, would succeed Graham as Nationwide CEO in Spring 2016.

In May 2016, the society confirmed that it would be closing its subsidiary on the Isle of Man, Nationwide International, following a review of its business. The branch, based in Douglas, provided a range of offshore savings accounts in euro, pound sterling and US dollars. It held assets in excess of £2.76 billion as at 31 March 2008, increasing to £3.69 billion by 31 March 2009, making it one of the largest deposit takers in the Isle of Man. Nationwide confirmed it would close on 30 June 2017.

On 1 October 2016, Carillion began providing services for Nationwide's headquarters in Swindon, 'specifically aligned to Nationwide's sustainability strategy'. This contract was expected to be worth approximately £350 million, building on an existing partnership of nearly nine years. When Carillion went into liquidation in January 2018, Nationwide took on 297 staff previously employed by the contractor.

In April 2017, the society confirmed that it would be closing its subsidiary on the Republic of Ireland, Nationwide UK (Ireland), following a review of its business.

On 31 May 2018, Nationwide announced it would be building a new community at Oakfield in Swindon working in partnership with Swindon Borough Council. Planning permission for the 239 houses was granted in 2019. The homes were planned to be EPC A rated and built on a not-for-profit model. In 2021 the development won the ‘Building for a Healthy Life’ prize as part of the Housing Design Awards.

=== 2020s rebrand and acquisition of Virgin Money ===
In March 2022, Kevin Parry replaced David Roberts as chairman; and in June 2022, Debbie Crosbie, who had been CEO of TSB Bank, succeeded Joe Garner, as chief executive.

In October 2023 Nationwide Building Society committed to its biggest rebrand since 1987, replacing its 'village' icon. The move was part of a wider commitment to maintain a High Street presence as many banks continue to close branches. All 605 branches were to receive investment to enable the building society to protect face-to-face customer interactions.

On 7 March 2024 Nationwide announced that they had made an offer to buy Virgin Money UK for £2.9 billion. Under the terms of the deal the resulting company would be rebranded under the Nationwide banner over the next six years with the Virgin Money brand eventually disappearing. Nationwide intends to remain as a building society and for the "medium-term" the Virgin Money business would remain its own legal entity with its own banking licence. Nationwide aims not to make any material changes to Virgin Money's 7,300 employees "in the near term". Virgin Money currently issue Scottish bank notes under the Clydesdale Bank branding.

Virgin Money's shareholders approved the deal on 22 May. On 31 May, the Competition and Markets Authority said that they would be investigating the proposed merger regarding the potential lessening of competition within the banking sector in the UK. On 19 July, the Competition and Markets Authority approved the acquisition. On 1 October, Nationwide completed its acquisition of Virgin Money, meaning one in three people in the UK have a connection to Nationwide.

Nationwide reported a £2.3 billion gain from its acquisition of Virgin Money, though its profits declined. Pre-tax profit dropped to £568 million for the six months to September, down from £989 million, partly due to its £100 Fairer Share Payment and competitive savings rates. CEO Debbie Crosbie wrote that future profits from Virgin Money would benefit customers. Virgin Money's profit rose to £558 million, driven by cost cuts. Richard Branson, Virgin Money's founder, made £724 million from the deal, which includes £310 million for Nationwide's use of the Virgin Money brand for up to six years.

In November 2025, Nationwide pledged to keep all of its 696 branches – 605 Nationwide and 91 Virgin Money branches – open until at least 2030.

Most of the business of Virgin Money's subsidiary Clydesdale Bank plc was legally transferred to Nationwide on 2 April 2026, under a banking business transfer scheme which was approved by the Companies Court on 23 February 2026. Nationwide intends to continue using the Virgin Money name for the transferred accounts, though Clydesdale Bank mortgages have changed to 'Clydesdale' branding, reflecting the change from prior status as a bank to a trading style of Nationwide Building Society. Customers of Virgin Money with a current account, savings account, or mortgage became Nationwide members as a result of the transfer.

In June 2026, Nationwide announced it was set to cut 600 jobs in a first round of cuts to reduce duplication of roles following the Virgin Money acquisition.

=== 2025 Financial Conduct Authority fine ===
On 12 December 2025, Nationwide was fined £44 million by the Financial Conduct Authority (FCA) for missing opportunities to identify fraudulent Covid furlough payments. The fraud happened mostly while Nationwide did not offer business accounts, but it was aware some customers were using personal accounts for business purposes. One customer used a personal current account to receive £27.3 million of fraudulent Covid furlough payments over 13 months, £26 million of that in only eight days. HM Revenue and Customs were able to recover most of the funds in question, except for about £800,000. Following the fine, Nationwide issued a press release in response, saying they fully cooperated with the FCA investigation.

=== 2026 – present ===
In April 2026, Nationwide was named by Forbes as the best bank in the United Kingdom.

== Mutual status ==
In 1998, society members seeking a windfall, branded as carpetbaggers by the UK media, required Nationwide members to vote on whether to demutualise the society and float on the London Stock Exchange. The attempt failed, despite media reports of possible pay-outs to members of around £1,000 to £1,500 each, as Nationwide members voted by a narrow margin of 1,135,587 to 1,101,887 (majority 33,700) against converting the building society into a bank.

Society members again proposed a resolution in 2001 for another vote by Nationwide members to demutualise the society to a bank. The resolution was rejected by the Nationwide board on legal grounds.

== Controversies ==
During the 2008 financial crisis, executive pay practices came under increasing scrutiny at Nationwide as in the rest of the financial sector. The Building Society Members' Association began to campaign against acceptance of remuneration reports at AGMs in 2009, and with the CEO's compensation rising 45% to £2.25 million by 2012 the board's levels of pay attracted criticism in The Guardian, and The Huffington Post.

Nationwide has also had to pay out over £473 million of compensation to customers for the mis-selling of Payment protection insurance (PPI). Nationwide had to scrap its intentions to pursue a digital business current account in April 2020, due to the effects of the COVID-19 pandemic. The society has said the pandemic had driven down the medium-term interest rates, which the society believed had made the project unviable. Nationwide committed to return the £50M grant from the Banking Competition Remedies scheme, which distributes funding that Royal Bank of Scotland was ordered to set aside as a condition of its 2009 bailout. The project is estimated to have cost members £70 million, but Nationwide have said that all staff working on the project will be redeployed elsewhere. It still provides some business savings accounts.

When restrictions were lifted following the COVID-19 pandemic, Nationwide stated that its office-based staff could choose whether to work from home or return to the office. From April 2024 employees were required to come into the office for two days per week.

In June 2023, Nationwide launched its Fairer Share initiative to redistribute profits back to its members but figures reported in the media suggested only 21% of Nationwide’s 16 million members would get a pay-out in its first year. The policy called into question whether the society's banking status now takes precedence over its advertised claims to offer fair member benefits as a building society.

In April 2024 the Advertising Standards Authority took action to ban a misleading advert by Nationwide that claimed it was not closing branches which was contrary to what the authority had found.

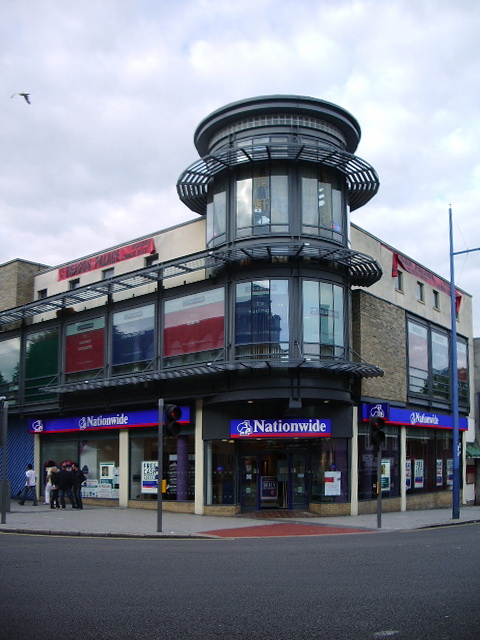
A branch of Nationwide in Southampton

== Financial performance ==
For the 2015/2016 Preliminary Results (April 2015–April 2016), underlying profits were up 9% to £1.337 billion, while statutory profits rose by 23% to £1.279 billion. Cost income ratio was 53.9%. Common Equity Tier 1 and leverage ratios improved to 23.2% and 4.2%. Gross and net lending were at £32.6 billion and £9.1 billion respectively. Nationwide helped 57,200 people buy their first home. Member deposits increased by £6.3 billion.

== Credit rating ==
Nationwide's long-term credit rating, as of the second half of 2022, was A1 with Moody's, A+ with Standard & Poor's and A+ with Fitch Ratings.

== Subsidiaries ==
Nationwide owns several subsidiary companies, including:

- Virgin Money UK – retail banking, mortgages and financial services
- Nationwide International Limited – offshore deposit taker
- Nationwide Syndications Limited – syndicated lending
- The Mortgage Works (UK) plc – specialised mortgage lender
- UCB Home Loans Corporation Limited – specialised mortgage lender
- Derbyshire Home Loans Limited – specialised mortgage lender
- E-MEX Home Funding Limited – specialised mortgage lender

== Key people ==
=== List of chairmen ===
1. Charles Nunneley (1996–2002)
2. Jonathan Agnew (2002–2007)
3. Geoffrey Howe (2007–2015)
4. David Roberts (2015–2022)
5. Kevin Parry (2022–present)

=== List of chief executives ===
1. Charles Cooper (1884–1892)
2. Arthur Webb (1892–1939)
3. Harry Score (1939–1947)
4. Stanley Lindsey (1947–1951)
5. Sir Herbert Ashworth (1951–1961)
6. Joe Simpson (1961–1967)
7. Leonard Williams (1967–1981)
8. Cyril English (1981–1985)
9. Sir Timothy Melville-Ross (1985–1994)
10. Brian Davis (1994–2001)
11. Philip Williamson (2002–2007)
12. Graham Beale (2007–2016)
13. Joe Garner (2016–2022)
14. Debbie Crosbie (2022–)

== See also ==
- Nationwide Group Staff Union
